

45001–45100 

|-bgcolor=#fefefe
| 45001 ||  || — || November 15, 1999 || Socorro || LINEAR || — || align=right | 2.7 km || 
|-id=002 bgcolor=#fefefe
| 45002 ||  || — || November 3, 1999 || Anderson Mesa || LONEOS || — || align=right | 2.3 km || 
|-id=003 bgcolor=#fefefe
| 45003 ||  || — || November 1, 1999 || Catalina || CSS || — || align=right | 4.0 km || 
|-id=004 bgcolor=#fefefe
| 45004 ||  || — || November 2, 1999 || Catalina || CSS || FLO || align=right | 1.2 km || 
|-id=005 bgcolor=#fefefe
| 45005 ||  || — || November 3, 1999 || Catalina || CSS || — || align=right | 2.1 km || 
|-id=006 bgcolor=#fefefe
| 45006 ||  || — || November 3, 1999 || Catalina || CSS || V || align=right | 1.1 km || 
|-id=007 bgcolor=#d6d6d6
| 45007 ||  || — || November 6, 1999 || Catalina || CSS || — || align=right | 5.3 km || 
|-id=008 bgcolor=#fefefe
| 45008 ||  || — || November 3, 1999 || Socorro || LINEAR || — || align=right | 4.2 km || 
|-id=009 bgcolor=#E9E9E9
| 45009 ||  || — || November 9, 1999 || Catalina || CSS || EUN || align=right | 5.0 km || 
|-id=010 bgcolor=#d6d6d6
| 45010 ||  || — || November 11, 1999 || Catalina || CSS || — || align=right | 6.5 km || 
|-id=011 bgcolor=#E9E9E9
| 45011 ||  || — || November 4, 1999 || Socorro || LINEAR || — || align=right | 2.5 km || 
|-id=012 bgcolor=#E9E9E9
| 45012 ||  || — || November 7, 1999 || Socorro || LINEAR || — || align=right | 3.5 km || 
|-id=013 bgcolor=#E9E9E9
| 45013 || 1999 WK || — || November 16, 1999 || Oizumi || T. Kobayashi || — || align=right | 5.2 km || 
|-id=014 bgcolor=#fefefe
| 45014 || 1999 WP || — || November 18, 1999 || Oizumi || T. Kobayashi || — || align=right | 2.4 km || 
|-id=015 bgcolor=#E9E9E9
| 45015 || 1999 WQ || — || November 16, 1999 || Ondřejov || P. Kušnirák || — || align=right | 3.3 km || 
|-id=016 bgcolor=#E9E9E9
| 45016 ||  || — || November 30, 1999 || Kleť || Kleť Obs. || GEF || align=right | 3.7 km || 
|-id=017 bgcolor=#fefefe
| 45017 ||  || — || November 28, 1999 || Oizumi || T. Kobayashi || — || align=right | 3.7 km || 
|-id=018 bgcolor=#fefefe
| 45018 ||  || — || November 28, 1999 || Oizumi || T. Kobayashi || — || align=right | 2.6 km || 
|-id=019 bgcolor=#fefefe
| 45019 ||  || — || November 28, 1999 || Oizumi || T. Kobayashi || V || align=right | 2.7 km || 
|-id=020 bgcolor=#d6d6d6
| 45020 ||  || — || November 28, 1999 || Oizumi || T. Kobayashi || — || align=right | 9.6 km || 
|-id=021 bgcolor=#fefefe
| 45021 ||  || — || November 28, 1999 || Višnjan Observatory || K. Korlević || NYS || align=right | 4.3 km || 
|-id=022 bgcolor=#fefefe
| 45022 ||  || — || November 28, 1999 || Višnjan Observatory || K. Korlević || V || align=right | 1.7 km || 
|-id=023 bgcolor=#E9E9E9
| 45023 ||  || — || November 28, 1999 || Višnjan Observatory || K. Korlević || — || align=right | 2.5 km || 
|-id=024 bgcolor=#fefefe
| 45024 ||  || — || November 28, 1999 || Višnjan Observatory || K. Korlević || — || align=right | 2.9 km || 
|-id=025 bgcolor=#E9E9E9
| 45025 ||  || — || November 29, 1999 || Višnjan Observatory || K. Korlević || — || align=right | 9.0 km || 
|-id=026 bgcolor=#fefefe
| 45026 ||  || — || November 28, 1999 || Kvistaberg || UDAS || — || align=right | 1.7 km || 
|-id=027 bgcolor=#E9E9E9
| 45027 Cosquer ||  ||  || November 28, 1999 || Gnosca || S. Sposetti || — || align=right | 4.8 km || 
|-id=028 bgcolor=#fefefe
| 45028 ||  || — || November 28, 1999 || Črni Vrh || Črni Vrh || V || align=right | 3.0 km || 
|-id=029 bgcolor=#E9E9E9
| 45029 ||  || — || November 30, 1999 || Oizumi || T. Kobayashi || — || align=right | 2.9 km || 
|-id=030 bgcolor=#E9E9E9
| 45030 ||  || — || November 30, 1999 || Kitt Peak || Spacewatch || — || align=right | 2.2 km || 
|-id=031 bgcolor=#d6d6d6
| 45031 ||  || — || November 29, 1999 || Višnjan Observatory || K. Korlević || — || align=right | 4.9 km || 
|-id=032 bgcolor=#fefefe
| 45032 ||  || — || November 29, 1999 || Kitt Peak || Spacewatch || — || align=right | 2.2 km || 
|-id=033 bgcolor=#E9E9E9
| 45033 ||  || — || November 16, 1999 || Socorro || LINEAR || — || align=right | 4.7 km || 
|-id=034 bgcolor=#E9E9E9
| 45034 ||  || — || December 3, 1999 || Fountain Hills || C. W. Juels || EUN || align=right | 3.6 km || 
|-id=035 bgcolor=#E9E9E9
| 45035 ||  || — || December 3, 1999 || Fountain Hills || C. W. Juels || — || align=right | 3.3 km || 
|-id=036 bgcolor=#fefefe
| 45036 ||  || — || December 4, 1999 || Catalina || CSS || — || align=right | 2.1 km || 
|-id=037 bgcolor=#E9E9E9
| 45037 ||  || — || December 4, 1999 || Catalina || CSS || — || align=right | 3.0 km || 
|-id=038 bgcolor=#fefefe
| 45038 ||  || — || December 4, 1999 || Catalina || CSS || V || align=right | 1.9 km || 
|-id=039 bgcolor=#E9E9E9
| 45039 ||  || — || December 4, 1999 || Prescott || P. G. Comba || — || align=right | 2.5 km || 
|-id=040 bgcolor=#E9E9E9
| 45040 ||  || — || December 3, 1999 || Oizumi || T. Kobayashi || — || align=right | 4.3 km || 
|-id=041 bgcolor=#fefefe
| 45041 ||  || — || December 5, 1999 || Catalina || CSS || V || align=right | 2.0 km || 
|-id=042 bgcolor=#fefefe
| 45042 ||  || — || December 5, 1999 || Catalina || CSS || — || align=right | 4.3 km || 
|-id=043 bgcolor=#fefefe
| 45043 ||  || — || December 5, 1999 || Catalina || CSS || V || align=right | 1.9 km || 
|-id=044 bgcolor=#fefefe
| 45044 ||  || — || December 5, 1999 || Socorro || LINEAR || — || align=right | 2.4 km || 
|-id=045 bgcolor=#fefefe
| 45045 ||  || — || December 7, 1999 || Socorro || LINEAR || PHO || align=right | 3.3 km || 
|-id=046 bgcolor=#fefefe
| 45046 ||  || — || December 5, 1999 || Socorro || LINEAR || NYS || align=right | 2.0 km || 
|-id=047 bgcolor=#fefefe
| 45047 ||  || — || December 5, 1999 || Socorro || LINEAR || — || align=right | 3.0 km || 
|-id=048 bgcolor=#fefefe
| 45048 ||  || — || December 5, 1999 || Socorro || LINEAR || — || align=right | 2.5 km || 
|-id=049 bgcolor=#fefefe
| 45049 ||  || — || December 5, 1999 || Socorro || LINEAR || V || align=right | 1.6 km || 
|-id=050 bgcolor=#E9E9E9
| 45050 ||  || — || December 5, 1999 || Socorro || LINEAR || EUN || align=right | 5.1 km || 
|-id=051 bgcolor=#fefefe
| 45051 ||  || — || December 6, 1999 || Socorro || LINEAR || — || align=right | 2.8 km || 
|-id=052 bgcolor=#fefefe
| 45052 ||  || — || December 6, 1999 || Socorro || LINEAR || V || align=right | 1.8 km || 
|-id=053 bgcolor=#fefefe
| 45053 ||  || — || December 6, 1999 || Socorro || LINEAR || NYS || align=right | 3.0 km || 
|-id=054 bgcolor=#E9E9E9
| 45054 ||  || — || December 6, 1999 || Socorro || LINEAR || — || align=right | 3.0 km || 
|-id=055 bgcolor=#fefefe
| 45055 ||  || — || December 6, 1999 || Socorro || LINEAR || — || align=right | 2.4 km || 
|-id=056 bgcolor=#fefefe
| 45056 ||  || — || December 6, 1999 || Socorro || LINEAR || — || align=right | 3.1 km || 
|-id=057 bgcolor=#fefefe
| 45057 ||  || — || December 6, 1999 || Socorro || LINEAR || V || align=right | 1.7 km || 
|-id=058 bgcolor=#fefefe
| 45058 ||  || — || December 6, 1999 || Socorro || LINEAR || FLO || align=right | 1.9 km || 
|-id=059 bgcolor=#fefefe
| 45059 ||  || — || December 6, 1999 || Socorro || LINEAR || V || align=right | 1.9 km || 
|-id=060 bgcolor=#fefefe
| 45060 ||  || — || December 6, 1999 || Socorro || LINEAR || V || align=right | 1.8 km || 
|-id=061 bgcolor=#E9E9E9
| 45061 ||  || — || December 6, 1999 || Socorro || LINEAR || — || align=right | 4.0 km || 
|-id=062 bgcolor=#d6d6d6
| 45062 ||  || — || December 6, 1999 || Socorro || LINEAR || — || align=right | 4.8 km || 
|-id=063 bgcolor=#E9E9E9
| 45063 ||  || — || December 6, 1999 || Socorro || LINEAR || — || align=right | 4.5 km || 
|-id=064 bgcolor=#E9E9E9
| 45064 ||  || — || December 6, 1999 || Socorro || LINEAR || — || align=right | 6.0 km || 
|-id=065 bgcolor=#E9E9E9
| 45065 ||  || — || December 6, 1999 || Socorro || LINEAR || — || align=right | 3.9 km || 
|-id=066 bgcolor=#E9E9E9
| 45066 ||  || — || December 6, 1999 || Socorro || LINEAR || MAR || align=right | 4.3 km || 
|-id=067 bgcolor=#d6d6d6
| 45067 ||  || — || December 6, 1999 || Socorro || LINEAR || — || align=right | 5.3 km || 
|-id=068 bgcolor=#d6d6d6
| 45068 ||  || — || December 6, 1999 || Socorro || LINEAR || EOS || align=right | 8.1 km || 
|-id=069 bgcolor=#d6d6d6
| 45069 ||  || — || December 6, 1999 || Socorro || LINEAR || — || align=right | 9.6 km || 
|-id=070 bgcolor=#fefefe
| 45070 ||  || — || December 6, 1999 || Gekko || T. Kagawa || NYS || align=right | 1.7 km || 
|-id=071 bgcolor=#fefefe
| 45071 ||  || — || December 7, 1999 || Oaxaca || J. M. Roe || — || align=right | 2.2 km || 
|-id=072 bgcolor=#fefefe
| 45072 ||  || — || December 7, 1999 || Fountain Hills || C. W. Juels || — || align=right | 3.1 km || 
|-id=073 bgcolor=#fefefe
| 45073 Doyanrose ||  ||  || December 7, 1999 || Doyan Rose || J. Ruthroff || V || align=right | 2.5 km || 
|-id=074 bgcolor=#FA8072
| 45074 ||  || — || December 6, 1999 || Gnosca || S. Sposetti || — || align=right | 1.6 km || 
|-id=075 bgcolor=#d6d6d6
| 45075 ||  || — || December 6, 1999 || Gnosca || S. Sposetti || — || align=right | 5.9 km || 
|-id=076 bgcolor=#E9E9E9
| 45076 ||  || — || December 8, 1999 || Socorro || LINEAR || — || align=right | 7.3 km || 
|-id=077 bgcolor=#fefefe
| 45077 ||  || — || December 6, 1999 || Socorro || LINEAR || V || align=right | 1.8 km || 
|-id=078 bgcolor=#E9E9E9
| 45078 ||  || — || December 6, 1999 || Socorro || LINEAR || — || align=right | 3.8 km || 
|-id=079 bgcolor=#E9E9E9
| 45079 ||  || — || December 7, 1999 || Socorro || LINEAR || — || align=right | 5.9 km || 
|-id=080 bgcolor=#fefefe
| 45080 ||  || — || December 7, 1999 || Socorro || LINEAR || NYS || align=right | 1.6 km || 
|-id=081 bgcolor=#fefefe
| 45081 ||  || — || December 7, 1999 || Socorro || LINEAR || FLO || align=right | 1.8 km || 
|-id=082 bgcolor=#fefefe
| 45082 ||  || — || December 7, 1999 || Socorro || LINEAR || V || align=right | 2.8 km || 
|-id=083 bgcolor=#fefefe
| 45083 ||  || — || December 7, 1999 || Socorro || LINEAR || V || align=right | 2.3 km || 
|-id=084 bgcolor=#fefefe
| 45084 ||  || — || December 7, 1999 || Socorro || LINEAR || NYS || align=right | 1.7 km || 
|-id=085 bgcolor=#fefefe
| 45085 ||  || — || December 7, 1999 || Socorro || LINEAR || — || align=right | 2.3 km || 
|-id=086 bgcolor=#fefefe
| 45086 ||  || — || December 7, 1999 || Socorro || LINEAR || FLO || align=right | 3.6 km || 
|-id=087 bgcolor=#E9E9E9
| 45087 ||  || — || December 7, 1999 || Socorro || LINEAR || — || align=right | 3.9 km || 
|-id=088 bgcolor=#d6d6d6
| 45088 ||  || — || December 7, 1999 || Socorro || LINEAR || — || align=right | 8.8 km || 
|-id=089 bgcolor=#E9E9E9
| 45089 ||  || — || December 7, 1999 || Socorro || LINEAR || — || align=right | 3.1 km || 
|-id=090 bgcolor=#E9E9E9
| 45090 ||  || — || December 7, 1999 || Socorro || LINEAR || — || align=right | 5.0 km || 
|-id=091 bgcolor=#E9E9E9
| 45091 ||  || — || December 7, 1999 || Socorro || LINEAR || — || align=right | 2.0 km || 
|-id=092 bgcolor=#fefefe
| 45092 ||  || — || December 7, 1999 || Socorro || LINEAR || NYS || align=right | 3.7 km || 
|-id=093 bgcolor=#fefefe
| 45093 ||  || — || December 7, 1999 || Socorro || LINEAR || NYS || align=right | 1.4 km || 
|-id=094 bgcolor=#E9E9E9
| 45094 ||  || — || December 7, 1999 || Socorro || LINEAR || — || align=right | 5.7 km || 
|-id=095 bgcolor=#fefefe
| 45095 ||  || — || December 7, 1999 || Socorro || LINEAR || — || align=right | 1.7 km || 
|-id=096 bgcolor=#E9E9E9
| 45096 ||  || — || December 7, 1999 || Socorro || LINEAR || — || align=right | 2.5 km || 
|-id=097 bgcolor=#E9E9E9
| 45097 ||  || — || December 7, 1999 || Socorro || LINEAR || — || align=right | 3.4 km || 
|-id=098 bgcolor=#fefefe
| 45098 ||  || — || December 7, 1999 || Socorro || LINEAR || — || align=right | 2.0 km || 
|-id=099 bgcolor=#d6d6d6
| 45099 ||  || — || December 7, 1999 || Socorro || LINEAR || — || align=right | 5.9 km || 
|-id=100 bgcolor=#fefefe
| 45100 ||  || — || December 7, 1999 || Socorro || LINEAR || — || align=right | 5.1 km || 
|}

45101–45200 

|-bgcolor=#fefefe
| 45101 ||  || — || December 7, 1999 || Socorro || LINEAR || V || align=right | 1.7 km || 
|-id=102 bgcolor=#fefefe
| 45102 ||  || — || December 7, 1999 || Socorro || LINEAR || — || align=right | 2.7 km || 
|-id=103 bgcolor=#d6d6d6
| 45103 ||  || — || December 7, 1999 || Socorro || LINEAR || — || align=right | 7.8 km || 
|-id=104 bgcolor=#fefefe
| 45104 ||  || — || December 7, 1999 || Socorro || LINEAR || NYS || align=right | 3.0 km || 
|-id=105 bgcolor=#d6d6d6
| 45105 ||  || — || December 7, 1999 || Socorro || LINEAR || — || align=right | 9.1 km || 
|-id=106 bgcolor=#E9E9E9
| 45106 ||  || — || December 7, 1999 || Socorro || LINEAR || — || align=right | 11 km || 
|-id=107 bgcolor=#fefefe
| 45107 ||  || — || December 7, 1999 || Socorro || LINEAR || NYS || align=right | 2.2 km || 
|-id=108 bgcolor=#d6d6d6
| 45108 ||  || — || December 7, 1999 || Socorro || LINEAR || ALA || align=right | 9.5 km || 
|-id=109 bgcolor=#d6d6d6
| 45109 ||  || — || December 7, 1999 || Socorro || LINEAR || slow || align=right | 10 km || 
|-id=110 bgcolor=#E9E9E9
| 45110 ||  || — || December 7, 1999 || Socorro || LINEAR || GEF || align=right | 3.3 km || 
|-id=111 bgcolor=#d6d6d6
| 45111 ||  || — || December 7, 1999 || Socorro || LINEAR || EOS || align=right | 6.7 km || 
|-id=112 bgcolor=#E9E9E9
| 45112 ||  || — || December 7, 1999 || Socorro || LINEAR || — || align=right | 3.3 km || 
|-id=113 bgcolor=#E9E9E9
| 45113 ||  || — || December 7, 1999 || Socorro || LINEAR || — || align=right | 2.0 km || 
|-id=114 bgcolor=#fefefe
| 45114 ||  || — || December 7, 1999 || Socorro || LINEAR || — || align=right | 2.4 km || 
|-id=115 bgcolor=#fefefe
| 45115 ||  || — || December 7, 1999 || Socorro || LINEAR || NYS || align=right | 1.7 km || 
|-id=116 bgcolor=#E9E9E9
| 45116 ||  || — || December 7, 1999 || Socorro || LINEAR || — || align=right | 2.4 km || 
|-id=117 bgcolor=#E9E9E9
| 45117 ||  || — || December 7, 1999 || Socorro || LINEAR || DOR || align=right | 6.1 km || 
|-id=118 bgcolor=#d6d6d6
| 45118 ||  || — || December 7, 1999 || Socorro || LINEAR || — || align=right | 9.1 km || 
|-id=119 bgcolor=#d6d6d6
| 45119 ||  || — || December 7, 1999 || Socorro || LINEAR || — || align=right | 7.6 km || 
|-id=120 bgcolor=#E9E9E9
| 45120 ||  || — || December 7, 1999 || Socorro || LINEAR || — || align=right | 5.9 km || 
|-id=121 bgcolor=#E9E9E9
| 45121 ||  || — || December 7, 1999 || Socorro || LINEAR || — || align=right | 5.9 km || 
|-id=122 bgcolor=#E9E9E9
| 45122 ||  || — || December 7, 1999 || Socorro || LINEAR || — || align=right | 3.2 km || 
|-id=123 bgcolor=#E9E9E9
| 45123 ||  || — || December 7, 1999 || Socorro || LINEAR || GEF || align=right | 5.1 km || 
|-id=124 bgcolor=#E9E9E9
| 45124 ||  || — || December 7, 1999 || Socorro || LINEAR || RAF || align=right | 5.3 km || 
|-id=125 bgcolor=#E9E9E9
| 45125 ||  || — || December 7, 1999 || Socorro || LINEAR || — || align=right | 2.8 km || 
|-id=126 bgcolor=#d6d6d6
| 45126 ||  || — || December 7, 1999 || Socorro || LINEAR || EOS || align=right | 5.8 km || 
|-id=127 bgcolor=#d6d6d6
| 45127 ||  || — || December 7, 1999 || Socorro || LINEAR || — || align=right | 4.7 km || 
|-id=128 bgcolor=#fefefe
| 45128 ||  || — || December 7, 1999 || Socorro || LINEAR || MAS || align=right | 2.2 km || 
|-id=129 bgcolor=#d6d6d6
| 45129 ||  || — || December 7, 1999 || Socorro || LINEAR || KOR || align=right | 5.1 km || 
|-id=130 bgcolor=#fefefe
| 45130 ||  || — || December 7, 1999 || Socorro || LINEAR || — || align=right | 4.9 km || 
|-id=131 bgcolor=#E9E9E9
| 45131 ||  || — || December 7, 1999 || Socorro || LINEAR || — || align=right | 4.1 km || 
|-id=132 bgcolor=#E9E9E9
| 45132 ||  || — || December 7, 1999 || Socorro || LINEAR || — || align=right | 3.9 km || 
|-id=133 bgcolor=#E9E9E9
| 45133 ||  || — || December 7, 1999 || Socorro || LINEAR || — || align=right | 4.4 km || 
|-id=134 bgcolor=#E9E9E9
| 45134 ||  || — || December 7, 1999 || Socorro || LINEAR || — || align=right | 3.9 km || 
|-id=135 bgcolor=#E9E9E9
| 45135 ||  || — || December 7, 1999 || Socorro || LINEAR || — || align=right | 3.1 km || 
|-id=136 bgcolor=#d6d6d6
| 45136 ||  || — || December 7, 1999 || Socorro || LINEAR || TIR || align=right | 7.5 km || 
|-id=137 bgcolor=#fefefe
| 45137 ||  || — || December 7, 1999 || Socorro || LINEAR || FLO || align=right | 2.2 km || 
|-id=138 bgcolor=#fefefe
| 45138 ||  || — || December 7, 1999 || Socorro || LINEAR || — || align=right | 3.4 km || 
|-id=139 bgcolor=#E9E9E9
| 45139 ||  || — || December 7, 1999 || Socorro || LINEAR || GEF || align=right | 4.9 km || 
|-id=140 bgcolor=#E9E9E9
| 45140 ||  || — || December 7, 1999 || Socorro || LINEAR || — || align=right | 3.7 km || 
|-id=141 bgcolor=#fefefe
| 45141 ||  || — || December 7, 1999 || Socorro || LINEAR || — || align=right | 2.6 km || 
|-id=142 bgcolor=#fefefe
| 45142 ||  || — || December 7, 1999 || Socorro || LINEAR || NYS || align=right | 1.8 km || 
|-id=143 bgcolor=#E9E9E9
| 45143 ||  || — || December 7, 1999 || Socorro || LINEAR || — || align=right | 7.1 km || 
|-id=144 bgcolor=#E9E9E9
| 45144 ||  || — || December 7, 1999 || Nachi-Katsuura || Y. Shimizu, T. Urata || — || align=right | 6.2 km || 
|-id=145 bgcolor=#fefefe
| 45145 ||  || — || December 8, 1999 || Nachi-Katsuura || H. Shiozawa, T. Urata || — || align=right | 3.7 km || 
|-id=146 bgcolor=#fefefe
| 45146 ||  || — || December 11, 1999 || Oizumi || T. Kobayashi || MAS || align=right | 2.5 km || 
|-id=147 bgcolor=#fefefe
| 45147 ||  || — || December 4, 1999 || Catalina || CSS || — || align=right | 2.1 km || 
|-id=148 bgcolor=#E9E9E9
| 45148 ||  || — || December 4, 1999 || Catalina || CSS || — || align=right | 2.4 km || 
|-id=149 bgcolor=#fefefe
| 45149 ||  || — || December 5, 1999 || Catalina || CSS || V || align=right | 2.2 km || 
|-id=150 bgcolor=#E9E9E9
| 45150 ||  || — || December 5, 1999 || Catalina || CSS || EUN || align=right | 3.9 km || 
|-id=151 bgcolor=#fefefe
| 45151 ||  || — || December 5, 1999 || Catalina || CSS || — || align=right | 3.3 km || 
|-id=152 bgcolor=#fefefe
| 45152 ||  || — || December 11, 1999 || Socorro || LINEAR || PHO || align=right | 5.9 km || 
|-id=153 bgcolor=#fefefe
| 45153 ||  || — || December 11, 1999 || Socorro || LINEAR || PHO || align=right | 4.6 km || 
|-id=154 bgcolor=#E9E9E9
| 45154 ||  || — || December 11, 1999 || Socorro || LINEAR || EUN || align=right | 4.2 km || 
|-id=155 bgcolor=#fefefe
| 45155 ||  || — || December 11, 1999 || Socorro || LINEAR || — || align=right | 4.3 km || 
|-id=156 bgcolor=#E9E9E9
| 45156 ||  || — || December 11, 1999 || Socorro || LINEAR || EUN || align=right | 7.1 km || 
|-id=157 bgcolor=#fefefe
| 45157 ||  || — || December 5, 1999 || Catalina || CSS || V || align=right | 2.4 km || 
|-id=158 bgcolor=#fefefe
| 45158 ||  || — || December 5, 1999 || Catalina || CSS || — || align=right | 2.3 km || 
|-id=159 bgcolor=#fefefe
| 45159 ||  || — || December 5, 1999 || Catalina || CSS || — || align=right | 2.7 km || 
|-id=160 bgcolor=#fefefe
| 45160 ||  || — || December 7, 1999 || Catalina || CSS || V || align=right | 2.0 km || 
|-id=161 bgcolor=#fefefe
| 45161 ||  || — || December 7, 1999 || Catalina || CSS || — || align=right | 3.6 km || 
|-id=162 bgcolor=#fefefe
| 45162 ||  || — || December 7, 1999 || Catalina || CSS || — || align=right | 3.3 km || 
|-id=163 bgcolor=#fefefe
| 45163 ||  || — || December 9, 1999 || Fountain Hills || C. W. Juels || — || align=right | 4.0 km || 
|-id=164 bgcolor=#FA8072
| 45164 ||  || — || December 9, 1999 || Fountain Hills || C. W. Juels || — || align=right | 2.0 km || 
|-id=165 bgcolor=#E9E9E9
| 45165 ||  || — || December 10, 1999 || Socorro || LINEAR || — || align=right | 3.5 km || 
|-id=166 bgcolor=#fefefe
| 45166 ||  || — || December 12, 1999 || Socorro || LINEAR || FLO || align=right | 1.8 km || 
|-id=167 bgcolor=#fefefe
| 45167 ||  || — || December 12, 1999 || Socorro || LINEAR || — || align=right | 2.8 km || 
|-id=168 bgcolor=#fefefe
| 45168 ||  || — || December 12, 1999 || Socorro || LINEAR || V || align=right | 1.3 km || 
|-id=169 bgcolor=#fefefe
| 45169 ||  || — || December 12, 1999 || Socorro || LINEAR || — || align=right | 4.0 km || 
|-id=170 bgcolor=#E9E9E9
| 45170 ||  || — || December 12, 1999 || Socorro || LINEAR || — || align=right | 9.9 km || 
|-id=171 bgcolor=#E9E9E9
| 45171 ||  || — || December 12, 1999 || Socorro || LINEAR || — || align=right | 7.7 km || 
|-id=172 bgcolor=#fefefe
| 45172 ||  || — || December 12, 1999 || Socorro || LINEAR || — || align=right | 4.6 km || 
|-id=173 bgcolor=#fefefe
| 45173 ||  || — || December 14, 1999 || Fountain Hills || C. W. Juels || — || align=right | 1.7 km || 
|-id=174 bgcolor=#fefefe
| 45174 ||  || — || December 2, 1999 || Anderson Mesa || LONEOS || — || align=right | 2.4 km || 
|-id=175 bgcolor=#fefefe
| 45175 ||  || — || December 2, 1999 || Kitt Peak || Spacewatch || — || align=right | 1.9 km || 
|-id=176 bgcolor=#E9E9E9
| 45176 ||  || — || December 2, 1999 || Kitt Peak || Spacewatch || — || align=right | 4.9 km || 
|-id=177 bgcolor=#d6d6d6
| 45177 ||  || — || December 2, 1999 || Kitt Peak || Spacewatch || — || align=right | 8.3 km || 
|-id=178 bgcolor=#fefefe
| 45178 ||  || — || December 13, 1999 || Farpoint || G. Hug, G. Bell || — || align=right | 2.2 km || 
|-id=179 bgcolor=#fefefe
| 45179 ||  || — || December 15, 1999 || Oohira || T. Urata || — || align=right | 8.5 km || 
|-id=180 bgcolor=#fefefe
| 45180 ||  || — || December 7, 1999 || Kitt Peak || Spacewatch || V || align=right | 1.9 km || 
|-id=181 bgcolor=#fefefe
| 45181 ||  || — || December 7, 1999 || Kitt Peak || Spacewatch || — || align=right | 1.9 km || 
|-id=182 bgcolor=#fefefe
| 45182 ||  || — || December 7, 1999 || Kitt Peak || Spacewatch || NYS || align=right | 1.7 km || 
|-id=183 bgcolor=#fefefe
| 45183 ||  || — || December 7, 1999 || Socorro || LINEAR || NYS || align=right | 2.0 km || 
|-id=184 bgcolor=#fefefe
| 45184 ||  || — || December 8, 1999 || Socorro || LINEAR || — || align=right | 6.2 km || 
|-id=185 bgcolor=#fefefe
| 45185 ||  || — || December 8, 1999 || Socorro || LINEAR || FLO || align=right | 2.0 km || 
|-id=186 bgcolor=#E9E9E9
| 45186 ||  || — || December 8, 1999 || Socorro || LINEAR || — || align=right | 2.4 km || 
|-id=187 bgcolor=#E9E9E9
| 45187 ||  || — || December 8, 1999 || Socorro || LINEAR || PAD || align=right | 6.4 km || 
|-id=188 bgcolor=#E9E9E9
| 45188 ||  || — || December 8, 1999 || Socorro || LINEAR || RAF || align=right | 3.2 km || 
|-id=189 bgcolor=#E9E9E9
| 45189 ||  || — || December 8, 1999 || Socorro || LINEAR || — || align=right | 4.8 km || 
|-id=190 bgcolor=#E9E9E9
| 45190 ||  || — || December 13, 1999 || Socorro || LINEAR || — || align=right | 2.5 km || 
|-id=191 bgcolor=#d6d6d6
| 45191 ||  || — || December 8, 1999 || Catalina || CSS || — || align=right | 11 km || 
|-id=192 bgcolor=#E9E9E9
| 45192 ||  || — || December 8, 1999 || Catalina || CSS || — || align=right | 3.6 km || 
|-id=193 bgcolor=#E9E9E9
| 45193 ||  || — || December 8, 1999 || Socorro || LINEAR || — || align=right | 3.7 km || 
|-id=194 bgcolor=#E9E9E9
| 45194 ||  || — || December 8, 1999 || Socorro || LINEAR || — || align=right | 3.9 km || 
|-id=195 bgcolor=#fefefe
| 45195 ||  || — || December 10, 1999 || Socorro || LINEAR || V || align=right | 2.8 km || 
|-id=196 bgcolor=#fefefe
| 45196 ||  || — || December 10, 1999 || Socorro || LINEAR || — || align=right | 3.2 km || 
|-id=197 bgcolor=#E9E9E9
| 45197 ||  || — || December 10, 1999 || Socorro || LINEAR || — || align=right | 6.6 km || 
|-id=198 bgcolor=#fefefe
| 45198 ||  || — || December 10, 1999 || Socorro || LINEAR || FLO || align=right | 2.1 km || 
|-id=199 bgcolor=#E9E9E9
| 45199 ||  || — || December 10, 1999 || Socorro || LINEAR || — || align=right | 5.1 km || 
|-id=200 bgcolor=#E9E9E9
| 45200 ||  || — || December 10, 1999 || Socorro || LINEAR || — || align=right | 2.9 km || 
|}

45201–45300 

|-bgcolor=#E9E9E9
| 45201 ||  || — || December 10, 1999 || Socorro || LINEAR || — || align=right | 5.2 km || 
|-id=202 bgcolor=#E9E9E9
| 45202 ||  || — || December 10, 1999 || Socorro || LINEAR || — || align=right | 5.9 km || 
|-id=203 bgcolor=#E9E9E9
| 45203 ||  || — || December 10, 1999 || Socorro || LINEAR || — || align=right | 2.8 km || 
|-id=204 bgcolor=#E9E9E9
| 45204 ||  || — || December 10, 1999 || Socorro || LINEAR || GEF || align=right | 3.9 km || 
|-id=205 bgcolor=#E9E9E9
| 45205 ||  || — || December 10, 1999 || Socorro || LINEAR || — || align=right | 5.4 km || 
|-id=206 bgcolor=#fefefe
| 45206 ||  || — || December 10, 1999 || Socorro || LINEAR || — || align=right | 7.0 km || 
|-id=207 bgcolor=#d6d6d6
| 45207 ||  || — || December 10, 1999 || Socorro || LINEAR || — || align=right | 8.6 km || 
|-id=208 bgcolor=#fefefe
| 45208 ||  || — || December 10, 1999 || Socorro || LINEAR || — || align=right | 3.2 km || 
|-id=209 bgcolor=#fefefe
| 45209 ||  || — || December 10, 1999 || Socorro || LINEAR || — || align=right | 2.4 km || 
|-id=210 bgcolor=#d6d6d6
| 45210 ||  || — || December 10, 1999 || Socorro || LINEAR || — || align=right | 9.3 km || 
|-id=211 bgcolor=#E9E9E9
| 45211 ||  || — || December 10, 1999 || Socorro || LINEAR || GEF || align=right | 3.0 km || 
|-id=212 bgcolor=#E9E9E9
| 45212 ||  || — || December 10, 1999 || Socorro || LINEAR || EUN || align=right | 4.2 km || 
|-id=213 bgcolor=#E9E9E9
| 45213 ||  || — || December 12, 1999 || Socorro || LINEAR || — || align=right | 2.8 km || 
|-id=214 bgcolor=#fefefe
| 45214 ||  || — || December 12, 1999 || Socorro || LINEAR || V || align=right | 1.7 km || 
|-id=215 bgcolor=#fefefe
| 45215 ||  || — || December 12, 1999 || Socorro || LINEAR || FLO || align=right | 2.7 km || 
|-id=216 bgcolor=#E9E9E9
| 45216 ||  || — || December 12, 1999 || Socorro || LINEAR || — || align=right | 8.0 km || 
|-id=217 bgcolor=#E9E9E9
| 45217 ||  || — || December 12, 1999 || Socorro || LINEAR || — || align=right | 6.2 km || 
|-id=218 bgcolor=#E9E9E9
| 45218 ||  || — || December 12, 1999 || Socorro || LINEAR || — || align=right | 3.0 km || 
|-id=219 bgcolor=#fefefe
| 45219 ||  || — || December 12, 1999 || Socorro || LINEAR || — || align=right | 3.7 km || 
|-id=220 bgcolor=#fefefe
| 45220 ||  || — || December 12, 1999 || Socorro || LINEAR || V || align=right | 2.7 km || 
|-id=221 bgcolor=#fefefe
| 45221 ||  || — || December 12, 1999 || Socorro || LINEAR || — || align=right | 3.5 km || 
|-id=222 bgcolor=#E9E9E9
| 45222 ||  || — || December 12, 1999 || Socorro || LINEAR || — || align=right | 5.8 km || 
|-id=223 bgcolor=#fefefe
| 45223 ||  || — || December 12, 1999 || Socorro || LINEAR || — || align=right | 2.9 km || 
|-id=224 bgcolor=#d6d6d6
| 45224 ||  || — || December 13, 1999 || Socorro || LINEAR || — || align=right | 4.8 km || 
|-id=225 bgcolor=#fefefe
| 45225 ||  || — || December 14, 1999 || Socorro || LINEAR || V || align=right | 1.6 km || 
|-id=226 bgcolor=#fefefe
| 45226 ||  || — || December 14, 1999 || Socorro || LINEAR || V || align=right | 1.7 km || 
|-id=227 bgcolor=#fefefe
| 45227 ||  || — || December 14, 1999 || Socorro || LINEAR || — || align=right | 2.6 km || 
|-id=228 bgcolor=#E9E9E9
| 45228 ||  || — || December 14, 1999 || Socorro || LINEAR || RAF || align=right | 3.1 km || 
|-id=229 bgcolor=#fefefe
| 45229 ||  || — || December 14, 1999 || Socorro || LINEAR || V || align=right | 2.5 km || 
|-id=230 bgcolor=#fefefe
| 45230 ||  || — || December 14, 1999 || Socorro || LINEAR || — || align=right | 2.1 km || 
|-id=231 bgcolor=#E9E9E9
| 45231 ||  || — || December 14, 1999 || Socorro || LINEAR || — || align=right | 3.6 km || 
|-id=232 bgcolor=#E9E9E9
| 45232 ||  || — || December 13, 1999 || Kitt Peak || Spacewatch || ADE || align=right | 7.5 km || 
|-id=233 bgcolor=#E9E9E9
| 45233 ||  || — || December 13, 1999 || Kitt Peak || Spacewatch || — || align=right | 5.9 km || 
|-id=234 bgcolor=#fefefe
| 45234 ||  || — || December 13, 1999 || Anderson Mesa || LONEOS || V || align=right | 2.8 km || 
|-id=235 bgcolor=#d6d6d6
| 45235 ||  || — || December 14, 1999 || Kitt Peak || Spacewatch || EOS || align=right | 5.3 km || 
|-id=236 bgcolor=#fefefe
| 45236 ||  || — || December 7, 1999 || Catalina || CSS || V || align=right | 2.0 km || 
|-id=237 bgcolor=#fefefe
| 45237 ||  || — || December 7, 1999 || Catalina || CSS || V || align=right | 1.6 km || 
|-id=238 bgcolor=#fefefe
| 45238 ||  || — || December 7, 1999 || Anderson Mesa || LONEOS || FLO || align=right | 2.8 km || 
|-id=239 bgcolor=#E9E9E9
| 45239 ||  || — || December 8, 1999 || Socorro || LINEAR || GEF || align=right | 3.8 km || 
|-id=240 bgcolor=#E9E9E9
| 45240 ||  || — || December 3, 1999 || Socorro || LINEAR || EUN || align=right | 3.5 km || 
|-id=241 bgcolor=#fefefe
| 45241 ||  || — || December 5, 1999 || Anderson Mesa || LONEOS || NYS || align=right | 1.7 km || 
|-id=242 bgcolor=#fefefe
| 45242 ||  || — || December 13, 1999 || Anderson Mesa || LONEOS || V || align=right | 1.5 km || 
|-id=243 bgcolor=#E9E9E9
| 45243 ||  || — || December 13, 1999 || Catalina || CSS || — || align=right | 3.0 km || 
|-id=244 bgcolor=#E9E9E9
| 45244 ||  || — || December 13, 1999 || Catalina || CSS || — || align=right | 2.8 km || 
|-id=245 bgcolor=#E9E9E9
| 45245 ||  || — || December 13, 1999 || Catalina || CSS || — || align=right | 4.8 km || 
|-id=246 bgcolor=#E9E9E9
| 45246 ||  || — || December 5, 1999 || Socorro || LINEAR || — || align=right | 4.3 km || 
|-id=247 bgcolor=#fefefe
| 45247 ||  || — || December 5, 1999 || Socorro || LINEAR || — || align=right | 2.1 km || 
|-id=248 bgcolor=#E9E9E9
| 45248 ||  || — || December 5, 1999 || Anderson Mesa || LONEOS || — || align=right | 7.5 km || 
|-id=249 bgcolor=#E9E9E9
| 45249 ||  || — || December 7, 1999 || Kitt Peak || Spacewatch || — || align=right | 4.1 km || 
|-id=250 bgcolor=#E9E9E9
| 45250 || 1999 YJ || — || December 16, 1999 || Socorro || LINEAR || — || align=right | 5.7 km || 
|-id=251 bgcolor=#FA8072
| 45251 || 1999 YN || — || December 16, 1999 || Socorro || LINEAR || — || align=right | 3.8 km || 
|-id=252 bgcolor=#E9E9E9
| 45252 ||  || — || December 16, 1999 || Kitt Peak || Spacewatch || — || align=right | 2.4 km || 
|-id=253 bgcolor=#E9E9E9
| 45253 ||  || — || December 28, 1999 || Farpoint || G. Hug, G. Bell || DOR || align=right | 8.1 km || 
|-id=254 bgcolor=#d6d6d6
| 45254 ||  || — || December 27, 1999 || Kitt Peak || Spacewatch || THM || align=right | 9.3 km || 
|-id=255 bgcolor=#d6d6d6
| 45255 ||  || — || December 31, 1999 || Farpoint || G. Hug, G. Bell || — || align=right | 7.3 km || 
|-id=256 bgcolor=#fefefe
| 45256 ||  || — || December 31, 1999 || Socorro || LINEAR || PHO || align=right | 3.1 km || 
|-id=257 bgcolor=#d6d6d6
| 45257 ||  || — || December 31, 1999 || Kitt Peak || Spacewatch || KAR || align=right | 3.0 km || 
|-id=258 bgcolor=#E9E9E9
| 45258 ||  || — || December 18, 1999 || Socorro || LINEAR || — || align=right | 6.4 km || 
|-id=259 bgcolor=#d6d6d6
| 45259 ||  || — || January 2, 2000 || Kitt Peak || Spacewatch || KOR || align=right | 4.3 km || 
|-id=260 bgcolor=#d6d6d6
| 45260 ||  || — || January 2, 2000 || Višnjan Observatory || K. Korlević || NAE || align=right | 7.6 km || 
|-id=261 bgcolor=#fefefe
| 45261 Decoen ||  ||  || January 2, 2000 || Gnosca || S. Sposetti || — || align=right | 3.2 km || 
|-id=262 bgcolor=#fefefe
| 45262 ||  || — || January 3, 2000 || Gekko || T. Kagawa || NYS || align=right | 1.9 km || 
|-id=263 bgcolor=#E9E9E9
| 45263 ||  || — || January 3, 2000 || Chiyoda || T. Kojima || EUN || align=right | 5.6 km || 
|-id=264 bgcolor=#E9E9E9
| 45264 ||  || — || January 4, 2000 || Višnjan Observatory || K. Korlević || — || align=right | 3.7 km || 
|-id=265 bgcolor=#d6d6d6
| 45265 ||  || — || January 4, 2000 || Kitt Peak || Spacewatch || — || align=right | 7.3 km || 
|-id=266 bgcolor=#d6d6d6
| 45266 ||  || — || January 4, 2000 || Prescott || P. G. Comba || KOR || align=right | 4.5 km || 
|-id=267 bgcolor=#fefefe
| 45267 ||  || — || January 2, 2000 || Socorro || LINEAR || V || align=right | 1.5 km || 
|-id=268 bgcolor=#E9E9E9
| 45268 ||  || — || January 2, 2000 || Socorro || LINEAR || — || align=right | 2.4 km || 
|-id=269 bgcolor=#fefefe
| 45269 ||  || — || January 2, 2000 || Socorro || LINEAR || V || align=right | 1.9 km || 
|-id=270 bgcolor=#fefefe
| 45270 ||  || — || January 2, 2000 || Socorro || LINEAR || V || align=right | 2.8 km || 
|-id=271 bgcolor=#E9E9E9
| 45271 ||  || — || January 3, 2000 || Socorro || LINEAR || — || align=right | 3.6 km || 
|-id=272 bgcolor=#E9E9E9
| 45272 ||  || — || January 3, 2000 || Socorro || LINEAR || — || align=right | 4.1 km || 
|-id=273 bgcolor=#E9E9E9
| 45273 ||  || — || January 3, 2000 || Socorro || LINEAR || — || align=right | 7.3 km || 
|-id=274 bgcolor=#fefefe
| 45274 ||  || — || January 3, 2000 || Socorro || LINEAR || — || align=right | 4.4 km || 
|-id=275 bgcolor=#E9E9E9
| 45275 ||  || — || January 3, 2000 || Socorro || LINEAR || GEF || align=right | 3.0 km || 
|-id=276 bgcolor=#E9E9E9
| 45276 ||  || — || January 3, 2000 || Socorro || LINEAR || PAD || align=right | 6.9 km || 
|-id=277 bgcolor=#fefefe
| 45277 ||  || — || January 3, 2000 || Socorro || LINEAR || — || align=right | 2.7 km || 
|-id=278 bgcolor=#fefefe
| 45278 ||  || — || January 3, 2000 || Socorro || LINEAR || NYS || align=right | 2.1 km || 
|-id=279 bgcolor=#fefefe
| 45279 ||  || — || January 3, 2000 || Socorro || LINEAR || — || align=right | 3.0 km || 
|-id=280 bgcolor=#fefefe
| 45280 ||  || — || January 3, 2000 || Socorro || LINEAR || — || align=right | 2.0 km || 
|-id=281 bgcolor=#E9E9E9
| 45281 ||  || — || January 3, 2000 || Socorro || LINEAR || MAR || align=right | 3.6 km || 
|-id=282 bgcolor=#fefefe
| 45282 ||  || — || January 3, 2000 || Socorro || LINEAR || — || align=right | 1.8 km || 
|-id=283 bgcolor=#E9E9E9
| 45283 ||  || — || January 3, 2000 || Socorro || LINEAR || EUN || align=right | 4.5 km || 
|-id=284 bgcolor=#E9E9E9
| 45284 ||  || — || January 3, 2000 || Socorro || LINEAR || PAD || align=right | 4.7 km || 
|-id=285 bgcolor=#E9E9E9
| 45285 ||  || — || January 3, 2000 || Socorro || LINEAR || — || align=right | 3.4 km || 
|-id=286 bgcolor=#E9E9E9
| 45286 ||  || — || January 3, 2000 || Socorro || LINEAR || — || align=right | 2.7 km || 
|-id=287 bgcolor=#fefefe
| 45287 ||  || — || January 3, 2000 || Socorro || LINEAR || — || align=right | 4.6 km || 
|-id=288 bgcolor=#d6d6d6
| 45288 ||  || — || January 3, 2000 || Socorro || LINEAR || EOS || align=right | 6.6 km || 
|-id=289 bgcolor=#E9E9E9
| 45289 ||  || — || January 3, 2000 || Socorro || LINEAR || — || align=right | 5.6 km || 
|-id=290 bgcolor=#E9E9E9
| 45290 ||  || — || January 3, 2000 || Socorro || LINEAR || EUN || align=right | 4.3 km || 
|-id=291 bgcolor=#fefefe
| 45291 ||  || — || January 3, 2000 || Socorro || LINEAR || — || align=right | 6.6 km || 
|-id=292 bgcolor=#d6d6d6
| 45292 ||  || — || January 3, 2000 || Socorro || LINEAR || — || align=right | 4.1 km || 
|-id=293 bgcolor=#E9E9E9
| 45293 ||  || — || January 3, 2000 || Socorro || LINEAR || — || align=right | 4.6 km || 
|-id=294 bgcolor=#E9E9E9
| 45294 ||  || — || January 3, 2000 || Socorro || LINEAR || HEN || align=right | 3.5 km || 
|-id=295 bgcolor=#E9E9E9
| 45295 ||  || — || January 3, 2000 || Socorro || LINEAR || — || align=right | 4.2 km || 
|-id=296 bgcolor=#E9E9E9
| 45296 ||  || — || January 3, 2000 || Socorro || LINEAR || HEN || align=right | 2.8 km || 
|-id=297 bgcolor=#fefefe
| 45297 ||  || — || January 3, 2000 || Socorro || LINEAR || NYS || align=right | 1.6 km || 
|-id=298 bgcolor=#d6d6d6
| 45298 Williamon ||  ||  || January 5, 2000 || Kitt Peak || A. Block || — || align=right | 5.9 km || 
|-id=299 bgcolor=#E9E9E9
| 45299 Stivell ||  ||  || January 6, 2000 || Kleť || M. Tichý || — || align=right | 2.1 km || 
|-id=300 bgcolor=#d6d6d6
| 45300 Thewrewk ||  ||  || January 1, 2000 || Piszkéstető || K. Sárneczky, L. Kiss || — || align=right | 13 km || 
|}

45301–45400 

|-bgcolor=#d6d6d6
| 45301 ||  || — || January 3, 2000 || Socorro || LINEAR || EOS || align=right | 5.1 km || 
|-id=302 bgcolor=#fefefe
| 45302 ||  || — || January 4, 2000 || Socorro || LINEAR || NYS || align=right | 2.2 km || 
|-id=303 bgcolor=#d6d6d6
| 45303 ||  || — || January 4, 2000 || Socorro || LINEAR || KOR || align=right | 4.2 km || 
|-id=304 bgcolor=#fefefe
| 45304 ||  || — || January 4, 2000 || Socorro || LINEAR || — || align=right | 3.3 km || 
|-id=305 bgcolor=#E9E9E9
| 45305 Paulscherrer ||  ||  || January 4, 2000 || Gnosca || S. Sposetti || MAR || align=right | 2.4 km || 
|-id=306 bgcolor=#d6d6d6
| 45306 ||  || — || January 5, 2000 || Višnjan Observatory || K. Korlević || HYG || align=right | 9.7 km || 
|-id=307 bgcolor=#d6d6d6
| 45307 ||  || — || January 6, 2000 || Višnjan Observatory || K. Korlević || EOS || align=right | 8.8 km || 
|-id=308 bgcolor=#fefefe
| 45308 ||  || — || January 4, 2000 || Socorro || LINEAR || — || align=right | 4.1 km || 
|-id=309 bgcolor=#fefefe
| 45309 ||  || — || January 4, 2000 || Socorro || LINEAR || NYS || align=right | 1.9 km || 
|-id=310 bgcolor=#E9E9E9
| 45310 ||  || — || January 4, 2000 || Socorro || LINEAR || — || align=right | 2.5 km || 
|-id=311 bgcolor=#d6d6d6
| 45311 ||  || — || January 4, 2000 || Socorro || LINEAR || CHA || align=right | 3.6 km || 
|-id=312 bgcolor=#d6d6d6
| 45312 ||  || — || January 4, 2000 || Socorro || LINEAR || — || align=right | 4.9 km || 
|-id=313 bgcolor=#E9E9E9
| 45313 ||  || — || January 4, 2000 || Socorro || LINEAR || — || align=right | 6.0 km || 
|-id=314 bgcolor=#fefefe
| 45314 ||  || — || January 4, 2000 || Socorro || LINEAR || — || align=right | 3.0 km || 
|-id=315 bgcolor=#fefefe
| 45315 ||  || — || January 4, 2000 || Socorro || LINEAR || NYS || align=right | 2.3 km || 
|-id=316 bgcolor=#d6d6d6
| 45316 ||  || — || January 4, 2000 || Socorro || LINEAR || CHA || align=right | 5.7 km || 
|-id=317 bgcolor=#d6d6d6
| 45317 ||  || — || January 4, 2000 || Socorro || LINEAR || — || align=right | 4.9 km || 
|-id=318 bgcolor=#d6d6d6
| 45318 ||  || — || January 4, 2000 || Socorro || LINEAR || TEL || align=right | 4.4 km || 
|-id=319 bgcolor=#E9E9E9
| 45319 ||  || — || January 4, 2000 || Socorro || LINEAR || — || align=right | 4.6 km || 
|-id=320 bgcolor=#E9E9E9
| 45320 ||  || — || January 4, 2000 || Socorro || LINEAR || — || align=right | 4.0 km || 
|-id=321 bgcolor=#fefefe
| 45321 ||  || — || January 4, 2000 || Socorro || LINEAR || — || align=right | 1.8 km || 
|-id=322 bgcolor=#E9E9E9
| 45322 ||  || — || January 4, 2000 || Socorro || LINEAR || PAD || align=right | 4.9 km || 
|-id=323 bgcolor=#fefefe
| 45323 ||  || — || January 5, 2000 || Socorro || LINEAR || — || align=right | 2.9 km || 
|-id=324 bgcolor=#fefefe
| 45324 ||  || — || January 5, 2000 || Socorro || LINEAR || V || align=right | 1.9 km || 
|-id=325 bgcolor=#E9E9E9
| 45325 ||  || — || January 5, 2000 || Socorro || LINEAR || — || align=right | 6.5 km || 
|-id=326 bgcolor=#E9E9E9
| 45326 ||  || — || January 5, 2000 || Socorro || LINEAR || — || align=right | 2.4 km || 
|-id=327 bgcolor=#fefefe
| 45327 ||  || — || January 5, 2000 || Socorro || LINEAR || — || align=right | 3.6 km || 
|-id=328 bgcolor=#fefefe
| 45328 ||  || — || January 5, 2000 || Socorro || LINEAR || — || align=right | 3.0 km || 
|-id=329 bgcolor=#fefefe
| 45329 ||  || — || January 5, 2000 || Socorro || LINEAR || — || align=right | 3.6 km || 
|-id=330 bgcolor=#E9E9E9
| 45330 ||  || — || January 5, 2000 || Socorro || LINEAR || — || align=right | 2.7 km || 
|-id=331 bgcolor=#E9E9E9
| 45331 ||  || — || January 5, 2000 || Socorro || LINEAR || — || align=right | 6.6 km || 
|-id=332 bgcolor=#fefefe
| 45332 ||  || — || January 5, 2000 || Socorro || LINEAR || — || align=right | 3.1 km || 
|-id=333 bgcolor=#E9E9E9
| 45333 ||  || — || January 5, 2000 || Socorro || LINEAR || — || align=right | 6.8 km || 
|-id=334 bgcolor=#d6d6d6
| 45334 ||  || — || January 5, 2000 || Socorro || LINEAR || KOR || align=right | 4.0 km || 
|-id=335 bgcolor=#E9E9E9
| 45335 ||  || — || January 5, 2000 || Socorro || LINEAR || — || align=right | 2.5 km || 
|-id=336 bgcolor=#E9E9E9
| 45336 ||  || — || January 5, 2000 || Socorro || LINEAR || GEF || align=right | 3.0 km || 
|-id=337 bgcolor=#fefefe
| 45337 ||  || — || January 5, 2000 || Socorro || LINEAR || NYS || align=right | 3.6 km || 
|-id=338 bgcolor=#d6d6d6
| 45338 ||  || — || January 5, 2000 || Socorro || LINEAR || — || align=right | 11 km || 
|-id=339 bgcolor=#E9E9E9
| 45339 ||  || — || January 5, 2000 || Socorro || LINEAR || — || align=right | 2.8 km || 
|-id=340 bgcolor=#E9E9E9
| 45340 ||  || — || January 5, 2000 || Socorro || LINEAR || GEF || align=right | 4.1 km || 
|-id=341 bgcolor=#d6d6d6
| 45341 ||  || — || January 5, 2000 || Socorro || LINEAR || CHA || align=right | 3.3 km || 
|-id=342 bgcolor=#d6d6d6
| 45342 ||  || — || January 5, 2000 || Socorro || LINEAR || — || align=right | 6.9 km || 
|-id=343 bgcolor=#E9E9E9
| 45343 ||  || — || January 5, 2000 || Socorro || LINEAR || — || align=right | 3.5 km || 
|-id=344 bgcolor=#d6d6d6
| 45344 ||  || — || January 5, 2000 || Socorro || LINEAR || EOS || align=right | 6.6 km || 
|-id=345 bgcolor=#d6d6d6
| 45345 ||  || — || January 5, 2000 || Socorro || LINEAR || — || align=right | 8.5 km || 
|-id=346 bgcolor=#d6d6d6
| 45346 ||  || — || January 5, 2000 || Socorro || LINEAR || — || align=right | 5.0 km || 
|-id=347 bgcolor=#d6d6d6
| 45347 ||  || — || January 5, 2000 || Socorro || LINEAR || — || align=right | 8.5 km || 
|-id=348 bgcolor=#E9E9E9
| 45348 ||  || — || January 5, 2000 || Socorro || LINEAR || — || align=right | 3.9 km || 
|-id=349 bgcolor=#fefefe
| 45349 ||  || — || January 5, 2000 || Socorro || LINEAR || — || align=right | 3.5 km || 
|-id=350 bgcolor=#d6d6d6
| 45350 ||  || — || January 4, 2000 || Socorro || LINEAR || — || align=right | 12 km || 
|-id=351 bgcolor=#E9E9E9
| 45351 ||  || — || January 4, 2000 || Socorro || LINEAR || GEF || align=right | 4.4 km || 
|-id=352 bgcolor=#E9E9E9
| 45352 ||  || — || January 4, 2000 || Socorro || LINEAR || ADE || align=right | 12 km || 
|-id=353 bgcolor=#fefefe
| 45353 ||  || — || January 5, 2000 || Socorro || LINEAR || NYS || align=right | 2.7 km || 
|-id=354 bgcolor=#fefefe
| 45354 ||  || — || January 5, 2000 || Socorro || LINEAR || V || align=right | 2.6 km || 
|-id=355 bgcolor=#fefefe
| 45355 ||  || — || January 5, 2000 || Socorro || LINEAR || — || align=right | 3.4 km || 
|-id=356 bgcolor=#fefefe
| 45356 ||  || — || January 5, 2000 || Socorro || LINEAR || — || align=right | 2.6 km || 
|-id=357 bgcolor=#fefefe
| 45357 ||  || — || January 5, 2000 || Socorro || LINEAR || ERI || align=right | 4.0 km || 
|-id=358 bgcolor=#fefefe
| 45358 ||  || — || January 5, 2000 || Socorro || LINEAR || — || align=right | 2.1 km || 
|-id=359 bgcolor=#fefefe
| 45359 ||  || — || January 5, 2000 || Socorro || LINEAR || — || align=right | 3.2 km || 
|-id=360 bgcolor=#fefefe
| 45360 ||  || — || January 5, 2000 || Socorro || LINEAR || V || align=right | 2.6 km || 
|-id=361 bgcolor=#fefefe
| 45361 ||  || — || January 5, 2000 || Socorro || LINEAR || V || align=right | 2.2 km || 
|-id=362 bgcolor=#d6d6d6
| 45362 ||  || — || January 5, 2000 || Socorro || LINEAR || — || align=right | 4.9 km || 
|-id=363 bgcolor=#E9E9E9
| 45363 ||  || — || January 5, 2000 || Socorro || LINEAR || — || align=right | 6.4 km || 
|-id=364 bgcolor=#fefefe
| 45364 ||  || — || January 5, 2000 || Socorro || LINEAR || V || align=right | 1.4 km || 
|-id=365 bgcolor=#E9E9E9
| 45365 ||  || — || January 5, 2000 || Socorro || LINEAR || MAR || align=right | 4.0 km || 
|-id=366 bgcolor=#d6d6d6
| 45366 ||  || — || January 5, 2000 || Socorro || LINEAR || — || align=right | 8.7 km || 
|-id=367 bgcolor=#E9E9E9
| 45367 ||  || — || January 5, 2000 || Socorro || LINEAR || GEF || align=right | 3.3 km || 
|-id=368 bgcolor=#fefefe
| 45368 ||  || — || January 5, 2000 || Socorro || LINEAR || — || align=right | 3.0 km || 
|-id=369 bgcolor=#fefefe
| 45369 ||  || — || January 5, 2000 || Socorro || LINEAR || NYS || align=right | 2.2 km || 
|-id=370 bgcolor=#d6d6d6
| 45370 ||  || — || January 5, 2000 || Socorro || LINEAR || KOR || align=right | 4.4 km || 
|-id=371 bgcolor=#E9E9E9
| 45371 ||  || — || January 5, 2000 || Socorro || LINEAR || AER || align=right | 3.6 km || 
|-id=372 bgcolor=#E9E9E9
| 45372 ||  || — || January 5, 2000 || Socorro || LINEAR || — || align=right | 5.3 km || 
|-id=373 bgcolor=#E9E9E9
| 45373 ||  || — || January 5, 2000 || Socorro || LINEAR || — || align=right | 3.8 km || 
|-id=374 bgcolor=#E9E9E9
| 45374 ||  || — || January 5, 2000 || Socorro || LINEAR || ADE || align=right | 7.2 km || 
|-id=375 bgcolor=#fefefe
| 45375 ||  || — || January 5, 2000 || Socorro || LINEAR || — || align=right | 3.2 km || 
|-id=376 bgcolor=#E9E9E9
| 45376 ||  || — || January 5, 2000 || Socorro || LINEAR || — || align=right | 4.8 km || 
|-id=377 bgcolor=#E9E9E9
| 45377 ||  || — || January 5, 2000 || Socorro || LINEAR || KRM || align=right | 4.0 km || 
|-id=378 bgcolor=#d6d6d6
| 45378 ||  || — || January 5, 2000 || Socorro || LINEAR || VER || align=right | 15 km || 
|-id=379 bgcolor=#E9E9E9
| 45379 ||  || — || January 5, 2000 || Socorro || LINEAR || — || align=right | 5.0 km || 
|-id=380 bgcolor=#d6d6d6
| 45380 ||  || — || January 5, 2000 || Socorro || LINEAR || EOS || align=right | 5.8 km || 
|-id=381 bgcolor=#d6d6d6
| 45381 ||  || — || January 5, 2000 || Socorro || LINEAR || HYG || align=right | 12 km || 
|-id=382 bgcolor=#d6d6d6
| 45382 ||  || — || January 5, 2000 || Socorro || LINEAR || EOS || align=right | 5.3 km || 
|-id=383 bgcolor=#fefefe
| 45383 ||  || — || January 5, 2000 || Socorro || LINEAR || — || align=right | 2.3 km || 
|-id=384 bgcolor=#d6d6d6
| 45384 ||  || — || January 5, 2000 || Socorro || LINEAR || CHA || align=right | 4.3 km || 
|-id=385 bgcolor=#E9E9E9
| 45385 ||  || — || January 5, 2000 || Socorro || LINEAR || EUN || align=right | 4.0 km || 
|-id=386 bgcolor=#d6d6d6
| 45386 ||  || — || January 5, 2000 || Socorro || LINEAR || EOS || align=right | 5.0 km || 
|-id=387 bgcolor=#E9E9E9
| 45387 ||  || — || January 5, 2000 || Socorro || LINEAR || — || align=right | 5.2 km || 
|-id=388 bgcolor=#d6d6d6
| 45388 ||  || — || January 5, 2000 || Socorro || LINEAR || EOS || align=right | 6.6 km || 
|-id=389 bgcolor=#d6d6d6
| 45389 ||  || — || January 5, 2000 || Socorro || LINEAR || — || align=right | 7.0 km || 
|-id=390 bgcolor=#d6d6d6
| 45390 ||  || — || January 5, 2000 || Socorro || LINEAR || NAE || align=right | 10 km || 
|-id=391 bgcolor=#d6d6d6
| 45391 ||  || — || January 5, 2000 || Socorro || LINEAR || EOS || align=right | 4.9 km || 
|-id=392 bgcolor=#E9E9E9
| 45392 ||  || — || January 5, 2000 || Socorro || LINEAR || EUN || align=right | 4.6 km || 
|-id=393 bgcolor=#E9E9E9
| 45393 ||  || — || January 6, 2000 || Socorro || LINEAR || — || align=right | 3.3 km || 
|-id=394 bgcolor=#d6d6d6
| 45394 ||  || — || January 3, 2000 || Socorro || LINEAR || — || align=right | 8.3 km || 
|-id=395 bgcolor=#E9E9E9
| 45395 ||  || — || January 4, 2000 || Socorro || LINEAR || — || align=right | 6.1 km || 
|-id=396 bgcolor=#E9E9E9
| 45396 ||  || — || January 5, 2000 || Socorro || LINEAR || — || align=right | 3.7 km || 
|-id=397 bgcolor=#E9E9E9
| 45397 ||  || — || January 5, 2000 || Socorro || LINEAR || — || align=right | 6.8 km || 
|-id=398 bgcolor=#E9E9E9
| 45398 ||  || — || January 5, 2000 || Socorro || LINEAR || — || align=right | 3.2 km || 
|-id=399 bgcolor=#fefefe
| 45399 ||  || — || January 5, 2000 || Socorro || LINEAR || — || align=right | 2.8 km || 
|-id=400 bgcolor=#d6d6d6
| 45400 ||  || — || January 5, 2000 || Socorro || LINEAR || — || align=right | 6.9 km || 
|}

45401–45500 

|-bgcolor=#fefefe
| 45401 ||  || — || January 5, 2000 || Socorro || LINEAR || — || align=right | 3.0 km || 
|-id=402 bgcolor=#E9E9E9
| 45402 ||  || — || January 5, 2000 || Socorro || LINEAR || — || align=right | 3.9 km || 
|-id=403 bgcolor=#E9E9E9
| 45403 ||  || — || January 5, 2000 || Socorro || LINEAR || EUN || align=right | 7.0 km || 
|-id=404 bgcolor=#d6d6d6
| 45404 ||  || — || January 5, 2000 || Socorro || LINEAR || — || align=right | 6.3 km || 
|-id=405 bgcolor=#fefefe
| 45405 ||  || — || January 5, 2000 || Socorro || LINEAR || ERI || align=right | 6.0 km || 
|-id=406 bgcolor=#E9E9E9
| 45406 ||  || — || January 5, 2000 || Socorro || LINEAR || EUN || align=right | 3.6 km || 
|-id=407 bgcolor=#E9E9E9
| 45407 ||  || — || January 5, 2000 || Socorro || LINEAR || — || align=right | 4.6 km || 
|-id=408 bgcolor=#d6d6d6
| 45408 ||  || — || January 5, 2000 || Socorro || LINEAR || EOS || align=right | 8.2 km || 
|-id=409 bgcolor=#d6d6d6
| 45409 ||  || — || January 5, 2000 || Socorro || LINEAR || EOS || align=right | 6.3 km || 
|-id=410 bgcolor=#d6d6d6
| 45410 ||  || — || January 5, 2000 || Socorro || LINEAR || EOS || align=right | 8.0 km || 
|-id=411 bgcolor=#E9E9E9
| 45411 ||  || — || January 5, 2000 || Socorro || LINEAR || — || align=right | 5.7 km || 
|-id=412 bgcolor=#E9E9E9
| 45412 ||  || — || January 5, 2000 || Socorro || LINEAR || HNA || align=right | 6.0 km || 
|-id=413 bgcolor=#fefefe
| 45413 ||  || — || January 5, 2000 || Socorro || LINEAR || V || align=right | 2.3 km || 
|-id=414 bgcolor=#fefefe
| 45414 ||  || — || January 7, 2000 || Socorro || LINEAR || — || align=right | 2.5 km || 
|-id=415 bgcolor=#E9E9E9
| 45415 ||  || — || January 7, 2000 || Socorro || LINEAR || — || align=right | 5.9 km || 
|-id=416 bgcolor=#fefefe
| 45416 ||  || — || January 8, 2000 || Socorro || LINEAR || — || align=right | 1.9 km || 
|-id=417 bgcolor=#fefefe
| 45417 ||  || — || January 8, 2000 || Socorro || LINEAR || — || align=right | 3.3 km || 
|-id=418 bgcolor=#E9E9E9
| 45418 ||  || — || January 3, 2000 || Socorro || LINEAR || — || align=right | 1.8 km || 
|-id=419 bgcolor=#E9E9E9
| 45419 ||  || — || January 3, 2000 || Socorro || LINEAR || — || align=right | 3.2 km || 
|-id=420 bgcolor=#E9E9E9
| 45420 ||  || — || January 3, 2000 || Socorro || LINEAR || — || align=right | 5.3 km || 
|-id=421 bgcolor=#d6d6d6
| 45421 ||  || — || January 3, 2000 || Socorro || LINEAR || — || align=right | 5.2 km || 
|-id=422 bgcolor=#d6d6d6
| 45422 ||  || — || January 4, 2000 || Socorro || LINEAR || — || align=right | 4.2 km || 
|-id=423 bgcolor=#E9E9E9
| 45423 ||  || — || January 4, 2000 || Socorro || LINEAR || EUN || align=right | 6.7 km || 
|-id=424 bgcolor=#E9E9E9
| 45424 ||  || — || January 7, 2000 || Socorro || LINEAR || — || align=right | 4.1 km || 
|-id=425 bgcolor=#d6d6d6
| 45425 ||  || — || January 8, 2000 || Socorro || LINEAR || — || align=right | 9.7 km || 
|-id=426 bgcolor=#E9E9E9
| 45426 ||  || — || January 8, 2000 || Socorro || LINEAR || — || align=right | 3.4 km || 
|-id=427 bgcolor=#d6d6d6
| 45427 ||  || — || January 8, 2000 || Socorro || LINEAR || INA || align=right | 10 km || 
|-id=428 bgcolor=#E9E9E9
| 45428 ||  || — || January 8, 2000 || Socorro || LINEAR || — || align=right | 4.5 km || 
|-id=429 bgcolor=#E9E9E9
| 45429 ||  || — || January 7, 2000 || Socorro || LINEAR || EUN || align=right | 2.8 km || 
|-id=430 bgcolor=#E9E9E9
| 45430 ||  || — || January 7, 2000 || Socorro || LINEAR || RAF || align=right | 2.8 km || 
|-id=431 bgcolor=#fefefe
| 45431 ||  || — || January 7, 2000 || Socorro || LINEAR || V || align=right | 1.9 km || 
|-id=432 bgcolor=#fefefe
| 45432 ||  || — || January 7, 2000 || Socorro || LINEAR || V || align=right | 1.7 km || 
|-id=433 bgcolor=#fefefe
| 45433 ||  || — || January 7, 2000 || Socorro || LINEAR || V || align=right | 1.8 km || 
|-id=434 bgcolor=#fefefe
| 45434 ||  || — || January 7, 2000 || Socorro || LINEAR || — || align=right | 4.1 km || 
|-id=435 bgcolor=#fefefe
| 45435 ||  || — || January 7, 2000 || Socorro || LINEAR || V || align=right | 1.7 km || 
|-id=436 bgcolor=#E9E9E9
| 45436 ||  || — || January 7, 2000 || Socorro || LINEAR || — || align=right | 3.9 km || 
|-id=437 bgcolor=#E9E9E9
| 45437 ||  || — || January 7, 2000 || Socorro || LINEAR || ADE || align=right | 5.7 km || 
|-id=438 bgcolor=#fefefe
| 45438 ||  || — || January 7, 2000 || Socorro || LINEAR || V || align=right | 2.1 km || 
|-id=439 bgcolor=#E9E9E9
| 45439 ||  || — || January 7, 2000 || Socorro || LINEAR || — || align=right | 7.2 km || 
|-id=440 bgcolor=#E9E9E9
| 45440 ||  || — || January 7, 2000 || Socorro || LINEAR || ADE || align=right | 9.9 km || 
|-id=441 bgcolor=#E9E9E9
| 45441 ||  || — || January 7, 2000 || Socorro || LINEAR || GEF || align=right | 3.7 km || 
|-id=442 bgcolor=#E9E9E9
| 45442 ||  || — || January 7, 2000 || Socorro || LINEAR || — || align=right | 3.4 km || 
|-id=443 bgcolor=#E9E9E9
| 45443 ||  || — || January 7, 2000 || Socorro || LINEAR || — || align=right | 12 km || 
|-id=444 bgcolor=#E9E9E9
| 45444 ||  || — || January 7, 2000 || Socorro || LINEAR || — || align=right | 3.4 km || 
|-id=445 bgcolor=#d6d6d6
| 45445 ||  || — || January 7, 2000 || Socorro || LINEAR || — || align=right | 6.7 km || 
|-id=446 bgcolor=#E9E9E9
| 45446 ||  || — || January 8, 2000 || Socorro || LINEAR || — || align=right | 3.7 km || 
|-id=447 bgcolor=#E9E9E9
| 45447 ||  || — || January 8, 2000 || Socorro || LINEAR || — || align=right | 3.8 km || 
|-id=448 bgcolor=#fefefe
| 45448 ||  || — || January 8, 2000 || Socorro || LINEAR || — || align=right | 3.0 km || 
|-id=449 bgcolor=#fefefe
| 45449 ||  || — || January 8, 2000 || Socorro || LINEAR || — || align=right | 7.0 km || 
|-id=450 bgcolor=#E9E9E9
| 45450 ||  || — || January 8, 2000 || Socorro || LINEAR || MAR || align=right | 4.9 km || 
|-id=451 bgcolor=#E9E9E9
| 45451 ||  || — || January 8, 2000 || Socorro || LINEAR || — || align=right | 6.9 km || 
|-id=452 bgcolor=#fefefe
| 45452 ||  || — || January 8, 2000 || Socorro || LINEAR || — || align=right | 4.3 km || 
|-id=453 bgcolor=#d6d6d6
| 45453 ||  || — || January 8, 2000 || Socorro || LINEAR || ALA || align=right | 16 km || 
|-id=454 bgcolor=#E9E9E9
| 45454 ||  || — || January 8, 2000 || Socorro || LINEAR || — || align=right | 5.2 km || 
|-id=455 bgcolor=#d6d6d6
| 45455 ||  || — || January 8, 2000 || Socorro || LINEAR || EOS || align=right | 6.8 km || 
|-id=456 bgcolor=#E9E9E9
| 45456 ||  || — || January 8, 2000 || Socorro || LINEAR || EUN || align=right | 5.3 km || 
|-id=457 bgcolor=#E9E9E9
| 45457 ||  || — || January 8, 2000 || Socorro || LINEAR || — || align=right | 4.5 km || 
|-id=458 bgcolor=#d6d6d6
| 45458 ||  || — || January 8, 2000 || Socorro || LINEAR || — || align=right | 5.4 km || 
|-id=459 bgcolor=#d6d6d6
| 45459 ||  || — || January 8, 2000 || Socorro || LINEAR || — || align=right | 9.6 km || 
|-id=460 bgcolor=#fefefe
| 45460 ||  || — || January 8, 2000 || Socorro || LINEAR || — || align=right | 6.5 km || 
|-id=461 bgcolor=#E9E9E9
| 45461 ||  || — || January 8, 2000 || Socorro || LINEAR || — || align=right | 4.4 km || 
|-id=462 bgcolor=#d6d6d6
| 45462 ||  || — || January 8, 2000 || Socorro || LINEAR || — || align=right | 5.6 km || 
|-id=463 bgcolor=#d6d6d6
| 45463 ||  || — || January 8, 2000 || Socorro || LINEAR || URS || align=right | 9.8 km || 
|-id=464 bgcolor=#d6d6d6
| 45464 ||  || — || January 8, 2000 || Socorro || LINEAR || — || align=right | 8.5 km || 
|-id=465 bgcolor=#E9E9E9
| 45465 ||  || — || January 9, 2000 || Socorro || LINEAR || MIT || align=right | 8.5 km || 
|-id=466 bgcolor=#d6d6d6
| 45466 ||  || — || January 9, 2000 || Socorro || LINEAR || EOS || align=right | 8.4 km || 
|-id=467 bgcolor=#E9E9E9
| 45467 ||  || — || January 10, 2000 || Socorro || LINEAR || — || align=right | 6.2 km || 
|-id=468 bgcolor=#d6d6d6
| 45468 ||  || — || January 10, 2000 || Socorro || LINEAR || ALA || align=right | 15 km || 
|-id=469 bgcolor=#E9E9E9
| 45469 ||  || — || January 10, 2000 || Socorro || LINEAR || — || align=right | 5.2 km || 
|-id=470 bgcolor=#E9E9E9
| 45470 ||  || — || January 10, 2000 || Socorro || LINEAR || MAR || align=right | 4.7 km || 
|-id=471 bgcolor=#E9E9E9
| 45471 ||  || — || January 13, 2000 || Kleť || Kleť Obs. || — || align=right | 5.5 km || 
|-id=472 bgcolor=#fefefe
| 45472 ||  || — || January 4, 2000 || Kitt Peak || Spacewatch || NYS || align=right | 1.5 km || 
|-id=473 bgcolor=#E9E9E9
| 45473 ||  || — || January 5, 2000 || Kitt Peak || Spacewatch || XIZ || align=right | 6.3 km || 
|-id=474 bgcolor=#d6d6d6
| 45474 ||  || — || January 7, 2000 || Kitt Peak || Spacewatch || KOR || align=right | 4.7 km || 
|-id=475 bgcolor=#E9E9E9
| 45475 ||  || — || January 8, 2000 || Kitt Peak || Spacewatch || — || align=right | 2.7 km || 
|-id=476 bgcolor=#E9E9E9
| 45476 ||  || — || January 9, 2000 || Kitt Peak || Spacewatch || — || align=right | 4.0 km || 
|-id=477 bgcolor=#E9E9E9
| 45477 ||  || — || January 9, 2000 || Kitt Peak || Spacewatch || — || align=right | 3.8 km || 
|-id=478 bgcolor=#E9E9E9
| 45478 ||  || — || January 3, 2000 || Kitt Peak || Spacewatch || AGN || align=right | 3.0 km || 
|-id=479 bgcolor=#E9E9E9
| 45479 ||  || — || January 4, 2000 || Socorro || LINEAR || — || align=right | 6.6 km || 
|-id=480 bgcolor=#E9E9E9
| 45480 ||  || — || January 4, 2000 || Kitt Peak || Spacewatch || — || align=right | 7.5 km || 
|-id=481 bgcolor=#E9E9E9
| 45481 ||  || — || January 4, 2000 || Socorro || LINEAR || — || align=right | 12 km || 
|-id=482 bgcolor=#fefefe
| 45482 ||  || — || January 5, 2000 || Socorro || LINEAR || V || align=right | 1.9 km || 
|-id=483 bgcolor=#d6d6d6
| 45483 ||  || — || January 5, 2000 || Socorro || LINEAR || — || align=right | 7.2 km || 
|-id=484 bgcolor=#d6d6d6
| 45484 ||  || — || January 5, 2000 || Socorro || LINEAR || KOR || align=right | 3.8 km || 
|-id=485 bgcolor=#E9E9E9
| 45485 ||  || — || January 5, 2000 || Socorro || LINEAR || — || align=right | 6.1 km || 
|-id=486 bgcolor=#E9E9E9
| 45486 ||  || — || January 5, 2000 || Socorro || LINEAR || — || align=right | 4.7 km || 
|-id=487 bgcolor=#E9E9E9
| 45487 ||  || — || January 5, 2000 || Socorro || LINEAR || EUN || align=right | 7.0 km || 
|-id=488 bgcolor=#fefefe
| 45488 ||  || — || January 6, 2000 || Socorro || LINEAR || — || align=right | 2.4 km || 
|-id=489 bgcolor=#E9E9E9
| 45489 ||  || — || January 6, 2000 || Anderson Mesa || LONEOS || — || align=right | 4.6 km || 
|-id=490 bgcolor=#E9E9E9
| 45490 ||  || — || January 7, 2000 || Anderson Mesa || LONEOS || HNS || align=right | 3.8 km || 
|-id=491 bgcolor=#E9E9E9
| 45491 ||  || — || January 7, 2000 || Anderson Mesa || LONEOS || — || align=right | 3.4 km || 
|-id=492 bgcolor=#E9E9E9
| 45492 Sławomirbreiter ||  ||  || January 7, 2000 || Anderson Mesa || LONEOS || MAR || align=right | 3.2 km || 
|-id=493 bgcolor=#d6d6d6
| 45493 ||  || — || January 7, 2000 || Socorro || LINEAR || — || align=right | 6.3 km || 
|-id=494 bgcolor=#d6d6d6
| 45494 ||  || — || January 7, 2000 || Socorro || LINEAR || — || align=right | 6.8 km || 
|-id=495 bgcolor=#E9E9E9
| 45495 ||  || — || January 7, 2000 || Anderson Mesa || LONEOS || — || align=right | 7.0 km || 
|-id=496 bgcolor=#d6d6d6
| 45496 ||  || — || January 10, 2000 || Socorro || LINEAR || — || align=right | 13 km || 
|-id=497 bgcolor=#E9E9E9
| 45497 ||  || — || January 2, 2000 || Socorro || LINEAR || — || align=right | 5.0 km || 
|-id=498 bgcolor=#E9E9E9
| 45498 || 2000 BH || — || January 23, 2000 || Olathe || Olathe || — || align=right | 2.9 km || 
|-id=499 bgcolor=#E9E9E9
| 45499 ||  || — || January 16, 2000 || Višnjan Observatory || K. Korlević || MAR || align=right | 3.6 km || 
|-id=500 bgcolor=#d6d6d6
| 45500 Motegi ||  ||  || January 27, 2000 || Oizumi || T. Kobayashi || THM || align=right | 7.9 km || 
|}

45501–45600 

|-bgcolor=#E9E9E9
| 45501 ||  || — || January 27, 2000 || Oizumi || T. Kobayashi || — || align=right | 7.8 km || 
|-id=502 bgcolor=#d6d6d6
| 45502 ||  || — || January 29, 2000 || Socorro || LINEAR || URS || align=right | 17 km || 
|-id=503 bgcolor=#d6d6d6
| 45503 ||  || — || January 31, 2000 || Oizumi || T. Kobayashi || — || align=right | 6.2 km || 
|-id=504 bgcolor=#E9E9E9
| 45504 ||  || — || January 29, 2000 || Socorro || LINEAR || — || align=right | 6.8 km || 
|-id=505 bgcolor=#fefefe
| 45505 ||  || — || January 30, 2000 || Socorro || LINEAR || NYS || align=right | 1.7 km || 
|-id=506 bgcolor=#E9E9E9
| 45506 ||  || — || January 30, 2000 || Socorro || LINEAR || — || align=right | 2.7 km || 
|-id=507 bgcolor=#E9E9E9
| 45507 ||  || — || January 30, 2000 || Socorro || LINEAR || — || align=right | 4.1 km || 
|-id=508 bgcolor=#d6d6d6
| 45508 ||  || — || January 30, 2000 || Socorro || LINEAR || KOR || align=right | 3.5 km || 
|-id=509 bgcolor=#E9E9E9
| 45509 Robertward ||  ||  || January 30, 2000 || Catalina || CSS || AER || align=right | 4.2 km || 
|-id=510 bgcolor=#d6d6d6
| 45510 Kashuba ||  ||  || January 30, 2000 || Catalina || CSS || EOS || align=right | 5.3 km || 
|-id=511 bgcolor=#d6d6d6
| 45511 Anneblack ||  ||  || January 30, 2000 || Catalina || CSS || 2:1J || align=right | 9.9 km || 
|-id=512 bgcolor=#d6d6d6
| 45512 Holcomb ||  ||  || January 30, 2000 || Catalina || CSS || EOS || align=right | 4.8 km || 
|-id=513 bgcolor=#d6d6d6
| 45513 ||  || — || January 27, 2000 || Socorro || LINEAR || EUP || align=right | 9.9 km || 
|-id=514 bgcolor=#E9E9E9
| 45514 ||  || — || January 29, 2000 || Socorro || LINEAR || — || align=right | 4.4 km || 
|-id=515 bgcolor=#d6d6d6
| 45515 ||  || — || January 30, 2000 || Socorro || LINEAR || THM || align=right | 11 km || 
|-id=516 bgcolor=#E9E9E9
| 45516 ||  || — || January 31, 2000 || Socorro || LINEAR || — || align=right | 3.1 km || 
|-id=517 bgcolor=#d6d6d6
| 45517 Jett ||  ||  || January 30, 2000 || Catalina || CSS || — || align=right | 3.7 km || 
|-id=518 bgcolor=#d6d6d6
| 45518 Larrykrozel ||  ||  || January 30, 2000 || Catalina || CSS || — || align=right | 6.8 km || 
|-id=519 bgcolor=#d6d6d6
| 45519 Triebold ||  ||  || January 30, 2000 || Catalina || CSS || — || align=right | 8.1 km || 
|-id=520 bgcolor=#E9E9E9
| 45520 ||  || — || January 31, 2000 || Socorro || LINEAR || — || align=right | 3.5 km || 
|-id=521 bgcolor=#d6d6d6
| 45521 ||  || — || January 27, 2000 || Kitt Peak || Spacewatch || — || align=right | 7.3 km || 
|-id=522 bgcolor=#d6d6d6
| 45522 ||  || — || January 31, 2000 || Socorro || LINEAR || KOR || align=right | 4.2 km || 
|-id=523 bgcolor=#d6d6d6
| 45523 ||  || — || January 27, 2000 || Kitt Peak || Spacewatch || — || align=right | 7.6 km || 
|-id=524 bgcolor=#d6d6d6
| 45524 ||  || — || February 2, 2000 || Oizumi || T. Kobayashi || NAE || align=right | 9.1 km || 
|-id=525 bgcolor=#fefefe
| 45525 ||  || — || February 2, 2000 || Socorro || LINEAR || — || align=right | 2.9 km || 
|-id=526 bgcolor=#fefefe
| 45526 ||  || — || February 2, 2000 || Socorro || LINEAR || NYS || align=right | 1.9 km || 
|-id=527 bgcolor=#E9E9E9
| 45527 ||  || — || February 2, 2000 || Socorro || LINEAR || GER || align=right | 4.9 km || 
|-id=528 bgcolor=#d6d6d6
| 45528 ||  || — || February 2, 2000 || Socorro || LINEAR || EOS || align=right | 5.1 km || 
|-id=529 bgcolor=#E9E9E9
| 45529 ||  || — || February 2, 2000 || Socorro || LINEAR || EUN || align=right | 5.2 km || 
|-id=530 bgcolor=#d6d6d6
| 45530 ||  || — || February 2, 2000 || Socorro || LINEAR || EOS || align=right | 5.3 km || 
|-id=531 bgcolor=#E9E9E9
| 45531 ||  || — || February 2, 2000 || Socorro || LINEAR || — || align=right | 3.6 km || 
|-id=532 bgcolor=#fefefe
| 45532 ||  || — || February 2, 2000 || Socorro || LINEAR || V || align=right | 1.8 km || 
|-id=533 bgcolor=#E9E9E9
| 45533 ||  || — || February 2, 2000 || Socorro || LINEAR || MIT || align=right | 8.8 km || 
|-id=534 bgcolor=#E9E9E9
| 45534 ||  || — || February 2, 2000 || Socorro || LINEAR || GEF || align=right | 4.0 km || 
|-id=535 bgcolor=#d6d6d6
| 45535 ||  || — || February 2, 2000 || Socorro || LINEAR || — || align=right | 4.3 km || 
|-id=536 bgcolor=#d6d6d6
| 45536 ||  || — || February 2, 2000 || Socorro || LINEAR || SYL7:4 || align=right | 11 km || 
|-id=537 bgcolor=#d6d6d6
| 45537 ||  || — || February 2, 2000 || Socorro || LINEAR || — || align=right | 6.5 km || 
|-id=538 bgcolor=#d6d6d6
| 45538 ||  || — || February 2, 2000 || Socorro || LINEAR || — || align=right | 4.8 km || 
|-id=539 bgcolor=#d6d6d6
| 45539 ||  || — || February 2, 2000 || Socorro || LINEAR || KOR || align=right | 3.9 km || 
|-id=540 bgcolor=#E9E9E9
| 45540 ||  || — || February 4, 2000 || Višnjan Observatory || K. Korlević || — || align=right | 4.0 km || 
|-id=541 bgcolor=#E9E9E9
| 45541 ||  || — || February 2, 2000 || Socorro || LINEAR || — || align=right | 7.8 km || 
|-id=542 bgcolor=#E9E9E9
| 45542 ||  || — || February 2, 2000 || Socorro || LINEAR || EUN || align=right | 4.7 km || 
|-id=543 bgcolor=#d6d6d6
| 45543 ||  || — || February 2, 2000 || Socorro || LINEAR || — || align=right | 6.2 km || 
|-id=544 bgcolor=#d6d6d6
| 45544 ||  || — || February 2, 2000 || Socorro || LINEAR || — || align=right | 8.4 km || 
|-id=545 bgcolor=#d6d6d6
| 45545 ||  || — || February 3, 2000 || Socorro || LINEAR || — || align=right | 9.0 km || 
|-id=546 bgcolor=#d6d6d6
| 45546 ||  || — || February 6, 2000 || Prescott || P. G. Comba || — || align=right | 7.6 km || 
|-id=547 bgcolor=#E9E9E9
| 45547 ||  || — || February 2, 2000 || Socorro || LINEAR || — || align=right | 4.4 km || 
|-id=548 bgcolor=#E9E9E9
| 45548 ||  || — || February 2, 2000 || Socorro || LINEAR || — || align=right | 5.2 km || 
|-id=549 bgcolor=#E9E9E9
| 45549 ||  || — || February 2, 2000 || Socorro || LINEAR || NEM || align=right | 3.5 km || 
|-id=550 bgcolor=#d6d6d6
| 45550 ||  || — || February 2, 2000 || Socorro || LINEAR || — || align=right | 8.7 km || 
|-id=551 bgcolor=#E9E9E9
| 45551 ||  || — || February 2, 2000 || Socorro || LINEAR || — || align=right | 3.0 km || 
|-id=552 bgcolor=#d6d6d6
| 45552 ||  || — || February 2, 2000 || Socorro || LINEAR || — || align=right | 6.1 km || 
|-id=553 bgcolor=#E9E9E9
| 45553 ||  || — || February 2, 2000 || Socorro || LINEAR || — || align=right | 3.8 km || 
|-id=554 bgcolor=#d6d6d6
| 45554 ||  || — || February 2, 2000 || Socorro || LINEAR || BRA || align=right | 4.9 km || 
|-id=555 bgcolor=#fefefe
| 45555 ||  || — || February 2, 2000 || Socorro || LINEAR || — || align=right | 2.9 km || 
|-id=556 bgcolor=#d6d6d6
| 45556 ||  || — || February 2, 2000 || Socorro || LINEAR || HYG || align=right | 9.4 km || 
|-id=557 bgcolor=#d6d6d6
| 45557 ||  || — || February 2, 2000 || Socorro || LINEAR || — || align=right | 10 km || 
|-id=558 bgcolor=#d6d6d6
| 45558 ||  || — || February 2, 2000 || Socorro || LINEAR || EOS || align=right | 6.0 km || 
|-id=559 bgcolor=#d6d6d6
| 45559 ||  || — || February 2, 2000 || Socorro || LINEAR || — || align=right | 4.2 km || 
|-id=560 bgcolor=#E9E9E9
| 45560 ||  || — || February 2, 2000 || Socorro || LINEAR || EUN || align=right | 3.2 km || 
|-id=561 bgcolor=#d6d6d6
| 45561 ||  || — || February 4, 2000 || Socorro || LINEAR || — || align=right | 6.6 km || 
|-id=562 bgcolor=#E9E9E9
| 45562 ||  || — || February 4, 2000 || Socorro || LINEAR || — || align=right | 4.3 km || 
|-id=563 bgcolor=#d6d6d6
| 45563 ||  || — || February 4, 2000 || Socorro || LINEAR || — || align=right | 7.9 km || 
|-id=564 bgcolor=#d6d6d6
| 45564 ||  || — || February 4, 2000 || Socorro || LINEAR || EOS || align=right | 4.5 km || 
|-id=565 bgcolor=#fefefe
| 45565 ||  || — || February 5, 2000 || Socorro || LINEAR || — || align=right | 6.0 km || 
|-id=566 bgcolor=#d6d6d6
| 45566 ||  || — || February 5, 2000 || Socorro || LINEAR || — || align=right | 18 km || 
|-id=567 bgcolor=#d6d6d6
| 45567 ||  || — || February 2, 2000 || Socorro || LINEAR || — || align=right | 11 km || 
|-id=568 bgcolor=#d6d6d6
| 45568 ||  || — || February 2, 2000 || Socorro || LINEAR || — || align=right | 14 km || 
|-id=569 bgcolor=#d6d6d6
| 45569 ||  || — || February 2, 2000 || Socorro || LINEAR || — || align=right | 7.3 km || 
|-id=570 bgcolor=#E9E9E9
| 45570 ||  || — || February 2, 2000 || Socorro || LINEAR || — || align=right | 5.7 km || 
|-id=571 bgcolor=#E9E9E9
| 45571 ||  || — || February 3, 2000 || Socorro || LINEAR || — || align=right | 3.5 km || 
|-id=572 bgcolor=#d6d6d6
| 45572 ||  || — || February 7, 2000 || Socorro || LINEAR || — || align=right | 8.5 km || 
|-id=573 bgcolor=#fefefe
| 45573 ||  || — || February 2, 2000 || Socorro || LINEAR || — || align=right | 3.0 km || 
|-id=574 bgcolor=#E9E9E9
| 45574 ||  || — || February 7, 2000 || Kitt Peak || Spacewatch || — || align=right | 8.6 km || 
|-id=575 bgcolor=#fefefe
| 45575 ||  || — || February 8, 2000 || Socorro || LINEAR || PHO || align=right | 3.9 km || 
|-id=576 bgcolor=#d6d6d6
| 45576 ||  || — || February 10, 2000 || Črni Vrh || H. Mikuž || EOS || align=right | 6.1 km || 
|-id=577 bgcolor=#d6d6d6
| 45577 ||  || — || February 10, 2000 || Višnjan Observatory || K. Korlević || — || align=right | 6.5 km || 
|-id=578 bgcolor=#d6d6d6
| 45578 ||  || — || February 8, 2000 || Prescott || P. G. Comba || — || align=right | 5.4 km || 
|-id=579 bgcolor=#d6d6d6
| 45579 ||  || — || February 8, 2000 || Kitt Peak || Spacewatch || VER || align=right | 8.3 km || 
|-id=580 bgcolor=#E9E9E9
| 45580 Renéracine ||  ||  || February 10, 2000 || Val-des-Bois || D. Bergeron || HOF || align=right | 6.6 km || 
|-id=581 bgcolor=#E9E9E9
| 45581 ||  || — || February 4, 2000 || Socorro || LINEAR || — || align=right | 6.4 km || 
|-id=582 bgcolor=#E9E9E9
| 45582 ||  || — || February 4, 2000 || Socorro || LINEAR || AGN || align=right | 4.5 km || 
|-id=583 bgcolor=#E9E9E9
| 45583 ||  || — || February 4, 2000 || Socorro || LINEAR || DOR || align=right | 13 km || 
|-id=584 bgcolor=#d6d6d6
| 45584 ||  || — || February 4, 2000 || Socorro || LINEAR || ALA || align=right | 9.2 km || 
|-id=585 bgcolor=#d6d6d6
| 45585 ||  || — || February 4, 2000 || Socorro || LINEAR || ALA || align=right | 12 km || 
|-id=586 bgcolor=#d6d6d6
| 45586 ||  || — || February 6, 2000 || Socorro || LINEAR || KOR || align=right | 4.9 km || 
|-id=587 bgcolor=#d6d6d6
| 45587 ||  || — || February 6, 2000 || Socorro || LINEAR || THM || align=right | 9.0 km || 
|-id=588 bgcolor=#E9E9E9
| 45588 ||  || — || February 6, 2000 || Socorro || LINEAR || — || align=right | 6.1 km || 
|-id=589 bgcolor=#d6d6d6
| 45589 ||  || — || February 13, 2000 || Višnjan Observatory || K. Korlević || THM || align=right | 9.2 km || 
|-id=590 bgcolor=#d6d6d6
| 45590 ||  || — || February 14, 2000 || Črni Vrh || Črni Vrh || VER || align=right | 10 km || 
|-id=591 bgcolor=#d6d6d6
| 45591 ||  || — || February 8, 2000 || Socorro || LINEAR || — || align=right | 15 km || 
|-id=592 bgcolor=#d6d6d6
| 45592 ||  || — || February 8, 2000 || Socorro || LINEAR || EOS || align=right | 7.2 km || 
|-id=593 bgcolor=#d6d6d6
| 45593 ||  || — || February 8, 2000 || Socorro || LINEAR || — || align=right | 6.4 km || 
|-id=594 bgcolor=#E9E9E9
| 45594 ||  || — || February 6, 2000 || Catalina || CSS || ADE || align=right | 3.9 km || 
|-id=595 bgcolor=#d6d6d6
| 45595 ||  || — || February 6, 2000 || Catalina || CSS || — || align=right | 3.4 km || 
|-id=596 bgcolor=#E9E9E9
| 45596 ||  || — || February 7, 2000 || Catalina || CSS || — || align=right | 4.1 km || 
|-id=597 bgcolor=#d6d6d6
| 45597 ||  || — || February 2, 2000 || Socorro || LINEAR || — || align=right | 8.0 km || 
|-id=598 bgcolor=#E9E9E9
| 45598 ||  || — || February 3, 2000 || Socorro || LINEAR || — || align=right | 2.9 km || 
|-id=599 bgcolor=#d6d6d6
| 45599 ||  || — || February 27, 2000 || Višnjan Observatory || K. Korlević, M. Jurić || — || align=right | 12 km || 
|-id=600 bgcolor=#E9E9E9
| 45600 ||  || — || February 28, 2000 || Socorro || LINEAR || — || align=right | 5.3 km || 
|}

45601–45700 

|-bgcolor=#d6d6d6
| 45601 ||  || — || February 28, 2000 || Socorro || LINEAR || EOS || align=right | 5.9 km || 
|-id=602 bgcolor=#d6d6d6
| 45602 ||  || — || February 28, 2000 || Črni Vrh || Črni Vrh || ALA || align=right | 15 km || 
|-id=603 bgcolor=#d6d6d6
| 45603 ||  || — || February 28, 2000 || Socorro || LINEAR || KOR || align=right | 4.1 km || 
|-id=604 bgcolor=#d6d6d6
| 45604 ||  || — || February 29, 2000 || Socorro || LINEAR || — || align=right | 4.7 km || 
|-id=605 bgcolor=#d6d6d6
| 45605 ||  || — || February 29, 2000 || Socorro || LINEAR || — || align=right | 10 km || 
|-id=606 bgcolor=#d6d6d6
| 45606 ||  || — || February 29, 2000 || Socorro || LINEAR || — || align=right | 7.8 km || 
|-id=607 bgcolor=#d6d6d6
| 45607 ||  || — || February 29, 2000 || Socorro || LINEAR || — || align=right | 7.3 km || 
|-id=608 bgcolor=#d6d6d6
| 45608 ||  || — || February 29, 2000 || Socorro || LINEAR || — || align=right | 3.9 km || 
|-id=609 bgcolor=#d6d6d6
| 45609 ||  || — || February 29, 2000 || Socorro || LINEAR || TEL || align=right | 5.3 km || 
|-id=610 bgcolor=#d6d6d6
| 45610 ||  || — || February 29, 2000 || Socorro || LINEAR || KOR || align=right | 4.1 km || 
|-id=611 bgcolor=#d6d6d6
| 45611 ||  || — || February 29, 2000 || Socorro || LINEAR || — || align=right | 7.8 km || 
|-id=612 bgcolor=#d6d6d6
| 45612 ||  || — || February 29, 2000 || Socorro || LINEAR || KOR || align=right | 4.0 km || 
|-id=613 bgcolor=#d6d6d6
| 45613 ||  || — || February 29, 2000 || Socorro || LINEAR || KOR || align=right | 4.3 km || 
|-id=614 bgcolor=#d6d6d6
| 45614 ||  || — || February 29, 2000 || Socorro || LINEAR || — || align=right | 4.0 km || 
|-id=615 bgcolor=#E9E9E9
| 45615 ||  || — || February 29, 2000 || Socorro || LINEAR || GEF || align=right | 2.4 km || 
|-id=616 bgcolor=#d6d6d6
| 45616 ||  || — || February 29, 2000 || Socorro || LINEAR || — || align=right | 6.6 km || 
|-id=617 bgcolor=#d6d6d6
| 45617 ||  || — || February 29, 2000 || Socorro || LINEAR || EMA || align=right | 5.1 km || 
|-id=618 bgcolor=#d6d6d6
| 45618 ||  || — || February 29, 2000 || Socorro || LINEAR || — || align=right | 8.8 km || 
|-id=619 bgcolor=#d6d6d6
| 45619 ||  || — || February 29, 2000 || Socorro || LINEAR || — || align=right | 11 km || 
|-id=620 bgcolor=#d6d6d6
| 45620 ||  || — || February 28, 2000 || Socorro || LINEAR || — || align=right | 4.7 km || 
|-id=621 bgcolor=#d6d6d6
| 45621 ||  || — || February 29, 2000 || Socorro || LINEAR || — || align=right | 6.2 km || 
|-id=622 bgcolor=#E9E9E9
| 45622 ||  || — || February 29, 2000 || Socorro || LINEAR || — || align=right | 3.9 km || 
|-id=623 bgcolor=#d6d6d6
| 45623 ||  || — || February 28, 2000 || Socorro || LINEAR || VER || align=right | 8.8 km || 
|-id=624 bgcolor=#d6d6d6
| 45624 ||  || — || February 28, 2000 || Socorro || LINEAR || — || align=right | 7.3 km || 
|-id=625 bgcolor=#d6d6d6
| 45625 ||  || — || February 28, 2000 || Socorro || LINEAR || EOS || align=right | 6.2 km || 
|-id=626 bgcolor=#d6d6d6
| 45626 ||  || — || February 28, 2000 || Socorro || LINEAR || — || align=right | 9.0 km || 
|-id=627 bgcolor=#E9E9E9
| 45627 ||  || — || February 29, 2000 || Socorro || LINEAR || EUN || align=right | 4.1 km || 
|-id=628 bgcolor=#d6d6d6
| 45628 ||  || — || February 29, 2000 || Socorro || LINEAR || KOR || align=right | 3.2 km || 
|-id=629 bgcolor=#d6d6d6
| 45629 ||  || — || February 29, 2000 || Socorro || LINEAR || VER || align=right | 12 km || 
|-id=630 bgcolor=#d6d6d6
| 45630 ||  || — || February 29, 2000 || Socorro || LINEAR || — || align=right | 11 km || 
|-id=631 bgcolor=#d6d6d6
| 45631 ||  || — || February 29, 2000 || Socorro || LINEAR || — || align=right | 10 km || 
|-id=632 bgcolor=#d6d6d6
| 45632 ||  || — || February 29, 2000 || Socorro || LINEAR || — || align=right | 6.0 km || 
|-id=633 bgcolor=#d6d6d6
| 45633 ||  || — || March 3, 2000 || Socorro || LINEAR || KOR || align=right | 3.5 km || 
|-id=634 bgcolor=#E9E9E9
| 45634 ||  || — || March 4, 2000 || Socorro || LINEAR || — || align=right | 4.6 km || 
|-id=635 bgcolor=#d6d6d6
| 45635 ||  || — || March 4, 2000 || Socorro || LINEAR || — || align=right | 7.1 km || 
|-id=636 bgcolor=#d6d6d6
| 45636 ||  || — || March 4, 2000 || Socorro || LINEAR || EOS || align=right | 6.0 km || 
|-id=637 bgcolor=#d6d6d6
| 45637 ||  || — || March 4, 2000 || Socorro || LINEAR || 7:4 || align=right | 9.4 km || 
|-id=638 bgcolor=#E9E9E9
| 45638 ||  || — || March 3, 2000 || Catalina || CSS || — || align=right | 3.7 km || 
|-id=639 bgcolor=#d6d6d6
| 45639 ||  || — || March 3, 2000 || Catalina || CSS || — || align=right | 14 km || 
|-id=640 bgcolor=#d6d6d6
| 45640 Mikepuzio ||  ||  || March 3, 2000 || Catalina || CSS || — || align=right | 4.6 km || 
|-id=641 bgcolor=#E9E9E9
| 45641 ||  || — || March 3, 2000 || Catalina || CSS || — || align=right | 2.8 km || 
|-id=642 bgcolor=#d6d6d6
| 45642 ||  || — || March 5, 2000 || Socorro || LINEAR || — || align=right | 5.6 km || 
|-id=643 bgcolor=#d6d6d6
| 45643 ||  || — || March 8, 2000 || Socorro || LINEAR || HYG || align=right | 6.0 km || 
|-id=644 bgcolor=#d6d6d6
| 45644 ||  || — || March 8, 2000 || Socorro || LINEAR || HYG || align=right | 8.9 km || 
|-id=645 bgcolor=#d6d6d6
| 45645 ||  || — || March 8, 2000 || Socorro || LINEAR || THM || align=right | 9.3 km || 
|-id=646 bgcolor=#d6d6d6
| 45646 ||  || — || March 9, 2000 || Socorro || LINEAR || — || align=right | 10 km || 
|-id=647 bgcolor=#d6d6d6
| 45647 ||  || — || March 9, 2000 || Socorro || LINEAR || — || align=right | 7.9 km || 
|-id=648 bgcolor=#d6d6d6
| 45648 ||  || — || March 9, 2000 || Socorro || LINEAR || — || align=right | 14 km || 
|-id=649 bgcolor=#d6d6d6
| 45649 ||  || — || March 9, 2000 || Socorro || LINEAR || EOS || align=right | 6.3 km || 
|-id=650 bgcolor=#E9E9E9
| 45650 ||  || — || March 6, 2000 || Višnjan Observatory || K. Korlević || — || align=right | 4.8 km || 
|-id=651 bgcolor=#E9E9E9
| 45651 ||  || — || March 10, 2000 || Socorro || LINEAR || — || align=right | 7.0 km || 
|-id=652 bgcolor=#d6d6d6
| 45652 ||  || — || March 10, 2000 || Socorro || LINEAR || 7:4 || align=right | 7.9 km || 
|-id=653 bgcolor=#d6d6d6
| 45653 ||  || — || March 10, 2000 || Socorro || LINEAR || SYL7:4 || align=right | 14 km || 
|-id=654 bgcolor=#d6d6d6
| 45654 ||  || — || March 10, 2000 || Kitt Peak || Spacewatch || — || align=right | 3.7 km || 
|-id=655 bgcolor=#E9E9E9
| 45655 ||  || — || March 10, 2000 || Kitt Peak || Spacewatch || EUN || align=right | 2.1 km || 
|-id=656 bgcolor=#E9E9E9
| 45656 ||  || — || March 10, 2000 || Kitt Peak || Spacewatch || — || align=right | 6.4 km || 
|-id=657 bgcolor=#E9E9E9
| 45657 ||  || — || March 5, 2000 || Socorro || LINEAR || — || align=right | 7.6 km || 
|-id=658 bgcolor=#d6d6d6
| 45658 ||  || — || March 5, 2000 || Socorro || LINEAR || EOS || align=right | 5.8 km || 
|-id=659 bgcolor=#d6d6d6
| 45659 ||  || — || March 6, 2000 || Socorro || LINEAR || EOS || align=right | 7.0 km || 
|-id=660 bgcolor=#d6d6d6
| 45660 ||  || — || March 8, 2000 || Socorro || LINEAR || — || align=right | 6.2 km || 
|-id=661 bgcolor=#E9E9E9
| 45661 ||  || — || March 8, 2000 || Socorro || LINEAR || — || align=right | 4.2 km || 
|-id=662 bgcolor=#d6d6d6
| 45662 ||  || — || March 8, 2000 || Socorro || LINEAR || — || align=right | 6.6 km || 
|-id=663 bgcolor=#d6d6d6
| 45663 ||  || — || March 8, 2000 || Socorro || LINEAR || EOS || align=right | 6.1 km || 
|-id=664 bgcolor=#d6d6d6
| 45664 ||  || — || March 9, 2000 || Socorro || LINEAR || — || align=right | 8.1 km || 
|-id=665 bgcolor=#d6d6d6
| 45665 ||  || — || March 9, 2000 || Socorro || LINEAR || EOS || align=right | 7.5 km || 
|-id=666 bgcolor=#d6d6d6
| 45666 ||  || — || March 9, 2000 || Socorro || LINEAR || URS || align=right | 10 km || 
|-id=667 bgcolor=#d6d6d6
| 45667 ||  || — || March 9, 2000 || Socorro || LINEAR || VER || align=right | 11 km || 
|-id=668 bgcolor=#E9E9E9
| 45668 ||  || — || March 9, 2000 || Socorro || LINEAR || — || align=right | 9.1 km || 
|-id=669 bgcolor=#d6d6d6
| 45669 ||  || — || March 10, 2000 || Socorro || LINEAR || — || align=right | 6.5 km || 
|-id=670 bgcolor=#d6d6d6
| 45670 ||  || — || March 12, 2000 || Socorro || LINEAR || — || align=right | 6.9 km || 
|-id=671 bgcolor=#d6d6d6
| 45671 ||  || — || March 14, 2000 || Socorro || LINEAR || EOS || align=right | 9.7 km || 
|-id=672 bgcolor=#d6d6d6
| 45672 ||  || — || March 8, 2000 || Haleakala || NEAT || slow || align=right | 12 km || 
|-id=673 bgcolor=#d6d6d6
| 45673 ||  || — || March 9, 2000 || Kitt Peak || Spacewatch || THM || align=right | 6.4 km || 
|-id=674 bgcolor=#d6d6d6
| 45674 ||  || — || March 9, 2000 || Socorro || LINEAR || — || align=right | 9.0 km || 
|-id=675 bgcolor=#E9E9E9
| 45675 ||  || — || March 9, 2000 || Socorro || LINEAR || — || align=right | 6.7 km || 
|-id=676 bgcolor=#E9E9E9
| 45676 ||  || — || March 10, 2000 || Haleakala || NEAT || — || align=right | 5.8 km || 
|-id=677 bgcolor=#d6d6d6
| 45677 ||  || — || March 11, 2000 || Anderson Mesa || LONEOS || ALA || align=right | 11 km || 
|-id=678 bgcolor=#d6d6d6
| 45678 ||  || — || March 11, 2000 || Anderson Mesa || LONEOS || — || align=right | 6.5 km || 
|-id=679 bgcolor=#d6d6d6
| 45679 ||  || — || March 11, 2000 || Anderson Mesa || LONEOS || — || align=right | 6.5 km || 
|-id=680 bgcolor=#d6d6d6
| 45680 ||  || — || March 11, 2000 || Anderson Mesa || LONEOS || — || align=right | 12 km || 
|-id=681 bgcolor=#d6d6d6
| 45681 ||  || — || March 11, 2000 || Anderson Mesa || LONEOS || — || align=right | 10 km || 
|-id=682 bgcolor=#d6d6d6
| 45682 ||  || — || March 11, 2000 || Anderson Mesa || LONEOS || EOS || align=right | 6.7 km || 
|-id=683 bgcolor=#E9E9E9
| 45683 ||  || — || March 11, 2000 || Anderson Mesa || LONEOS || — || align=right | 4.7 km || 
|-id=684 bgcolor=#d6d6d6
| 45684 ||  || — || March 13, 2000 || Socorro || LINEAR || — || align=right | 6.8 km || 
|-id=685 bgcolor=#d6d6d6
| 45685 Torrycoppin ||  ||  || March 11, 2000 || Catalina || CSS || — || align=right | 10 km || 
|-id=686 bgcolor=#d6d6d6
| 45686 ||  || — || March 11, 2000 || Anderson Mesa || LONEOS || — || align=right | 7.3 km || 
|-id=687 bgcolor=#d6d6d6
| 45687 Pranverahyseni ||  ||  || March 1, 2000 || Catalina || CSS || URS || align=right | 13 km || 
|-id=688 bgcolor=#E9E9E9
| 45688 Lawrencestacey ||  ||  || March 3, 2000 || Catalina || CSS || ADE || align=right | 6.1 km || 
|-id=689 bgcolor=#d6d6d6
| 45689 Brianjones ||  ||  || March 3, 2000 || Catalina || CSS || — || align=right | 6.3 km || 
|-id=690 bgcolor=#E9E9E9
| 45690 ||  || — || March 4, 2000 || Catalina || CSS || EUN || align=right | 4.2 km || 
|-id=691 bgcolor=#d6d6d6
| 45691 ||  || — || March 4, 2000 || Catalina || CSS || VER || align=right | 11 km || 
|-id=692 bgcolor=#E9E9E9
| 45692 Poshyachinda ||  ||  || March 4, 2000 || Catalina || CSS || — || align=right | 4.1 km || 
|-id=693 bgcolor=#d6d6d6
| 45693 ||  || — || March 5, 2000 || Socorro || LINEAR || — || align=right | 4.7 km || 
|-id=694 bgcolor=#fefefe
| 45694 ||  || — || March 5, 2000 || Haleakala || NEAT || PHO || align=right | 4.7 km || 
|-id=695 bgcolor=#d6d6d6
| 45695 ||  || — || March 5, 2000 || Haleakala || NEAT || KOR || align=right | 4.3 km || 
|-id=696 bgcolor=#d6d6d6
| 45696 ||  || — || March 4, 2000 || Socorro || LINEAR || EOS || align=right | 7.0 km || 
|-id=697 bgcolor=#d6d6d6
| 45697 ||  || — || March 5, 2000 || Socorro || LINEAR || — || align=right | 5.5 km || 
|-id=698 bgcolor=#E9E9E9
| 45698 ||  || — || March 4, 2000 || Socorro || LINEAR || — || align=right | 2.3 km || 
|-id=699 bgcolor=#E9E9E9
| 45699 Maryalba ||  ||  || March 1, 2000 || Catalina || CSS || — || align=right | 4.7 km || 
|-id=700 bgcolor=#E9E9E9
| 45700 Levi-Setti ||  ||  || March 3, 2000 || Catalina || CSS || EUN || align=right | 4.1 km || 
|}

45701–45800 

|-bgcolor=#d6d6d6
| 45701 ||  || — || March 28, 2000 || Socorro || LINEAR || — || align=right | 6.7 km || 
|-id=702 bgcolor=#fefefe
| 45702 ||  || — || March 29, 2000 || Socorro || LINEAR || PHO || align=right | 4.1 km || 
|-id=703 bgcolor=#E9E9E9
| 45703 ||  || — || March 29, 2000 || Socorro || LINEAR || — || align=right | 4.9 km || 
|-id=704 bgcolor=#E9E9E9
| 45704 ||  || — || March 29, 2000 || Socorro || LINEAR || — || align=right | 6.8 km || 
|-id=705 bgcolor=#E9E9E9
| 45705 ||  || — || March 28, 2000 || Socorro || LINEAR || — || align=right | 5.6 km || 
|-id=706 bgcolor=#d6d6d6
| 45706 ||  || — || March 29, 2000 || Socorro || LINEAR || — || align=right | 7.6 km || 
|-id=707 bgcolor=#d6d6d6
| 45707 ||  || — || March 29, 2000 || Socorro || LINEAR || — || align=right | 6.6 km || 
|-id=708 bgcolor=#E9E9E9
| 45708 ||  || — || March 29, 2000 || Socorro || LINEAR || — || align=right | 7.3 km || 
|-id=709 bgcolor=#d6d6d6
| 45709 ||  || — || March 29, 2000 || Socorro || LINEAR || 7:4 || align=right | 12 km || 
|-id=710 bgcolor=#E9E9E9
| 45710 ||  || — || March 29, 2000 || Socorro || LINEAR || — || align=right | 5.8 km || 
|-id=711 bgcolor=#E9E9E9
| 45711 ||  || — || March 28, 2000 || Socorro || LINEAR || — || align=right | 3.4 km || 
|-id=712 bgcolor=#d6d6d6
| 45712 ||  || — || March 29, 2000 || Socorro || LINEAR || EOS || align=right | 6.8 km || 
|-id=713 bgcolor=#d6d6d6
| 45713 ||  || — || March 29, 2000 || Kitt Peak || Spacewatch || THM || align=right | 6.2 km || 
|-id=714 bgcolor=#d6d6d6
| 45714 ||  || — || March 26, 2000 || Anderson Mesa || LONEOS || EOS || align=right | 6.3 km || 
|-id=715 bgcolor=#E9E9E9
| 45715 ||  || — || March 25, 2000 || Kitt Peak || Spacewatch || — || align=right | 2.6 km || 
|-id=716 bgcolor=#d6d6d6
| 45716 ||  || — || April 5, 2000 || Socorro || LINEAR || THM || align=right | 9.0 km || 
|-id=717 bgcolor=#d6d6d6
| 45717 ||  || — || April 5, 2000 || Socorro || LINEAR || HYG || align=right | 6.0 km || 
|-id=718 bgcolor=#d6d6d6
| 45718 ||  || — || April 5, 2000 || Socorro || LINEAR || — || align=right | 8.2 km || 
|-id=719 bgcolor=#d6d6d6
| 45719 ||  || — || April 5, 2000 || Socorro || LINEAR || — || align=right | 8.3 km || 
|-id=720 bgcolor=#d6d6d6
| 45720 ||  || — || April 5, 2000 || Socorro || LINEAR || — || align=right | 7.9 km || 
|-id=721 bgcolor=#d6d6d6
| 45721 ||  || — || April 5, 2000 || Socorro || LINEAR || 3:2 || align=right | 8.5 km || 
|-id=722 bgcolor=#d6d6d6
| 45722 ||  || — || April 5, 2000 || Socorro || LINEAR || TEL || align=right | 5.2 km || 
|-id=723 bgcolor=#d6d6d6
| 45723 ||  || — || April 5, 2000 || Socorro || LINEAR || — || align=right | 8.4 km || 
|-id=724 bgcolor=#d6d6d6
| 45724 ||  || — || April 5, 2000 || Socorro || LINEAR || EOS || align=right | 6.0 km || 
|-id=725 bgcolor=#E9E9E9
| 45725 ||  || — || April 5, 2000 || Socorro || LINEAR || — || align=right | 3.5 km || 
|-id=726 bgcolor=#d6d6d6
| 45726 ||  || — || April 3, 2000 || Socorro || LINEAR || — || align=right | 8.6 km || 
|-id=727 bgcolor=#d6d6d6
| 45727 ||  || — || April 3, 2000 || Socorro || LINEAR || VER || align=right | 8.7 km || 
|-id=728 bgcolor=#d6d6d6
| 45728 ||  || — || April 4, 2000 || Socorro || LINEAR || — || align=right | 9.4 km || 
|-id=729 bgcolor=#E9E9E9
| 45729 ||  || — || April 4, 2000 || Socorro || LINEAR || GEF || align=right | 4.8 km || 
|-id=730 bgcolor=#d6d6d6
| 45730 ||  || — || April 7, 2000 || Socorro || LINEAR || — || align=right | 7.2 km || 
|-id=731 bgcolor=#E9E9E9
| 45731 ||  || — || April 7, 2000 || Socorro || LINEAR || — || align=right | 5.0 km || 
|-id=732 bgcolor=#d6d6d6
| 45732 ||  || — || April 12, 2000 || Socorro || LINEAR || EOS || align=right | 6.8 km || 
|-id=733 bgcolor=#d6d6d6
| 45733 ||  || — || April 4, 2000 || Anderson Mesa || LONEOS || EOS || align=right | 6.1 km || 
|-id=734 bgcolor=#d6d6d6
| 45734 ||  || — || April 4, 2000 || Anderson Mesa || LONEOS || — || align=right | 11 km || 
|-id=735 bgcolor=#d6d6d6
| 45735 ||  || — || April 7, 2000 || Socorro || LINEAR || — || align=right | 13 km || 
|-id=736 bgcolor=#E9E9E9
| 45736 ||  || — || April 4, 2000 || Anderson Mesa || LONEOS || — || align=right | 3.2 km || 
|-id=737 bgcolor=#d6d6d6
| 45737 Benita || 2000 HB ||  || April 22, 2000 || Boca Raton || B. A. Segal || — || align=right | 5.1 km || 
|-id=738 bgcolor=#d6d6d6
| 45738 ||  || — || April 27, 2000 || Kitt Peak || Spacewatch || — || align=right | 13 km || 
|-id=739 bgcolor=#d6d6d6
| 45739 ||  || — || April 24, 2000 || Anderson Mesa || LONEOS || Tj (2.95) || align=right | 16 km || 
|-id=740 bgcolor=#d6d6d6
| 45740 ||  || — || April 27, 2000 || Socorro || LINEAR || — || align=right | 7.4 km || 
|-id=741 bgcolor=#d6d6d6
| 45741 ||  || — || April 24, 2000 || Anderson Mesa || LONEOS || — || align=right | 6.4 km || 
|-id=742 bgcolor=#fefefe
| 45742 ||  || — || April 26, 2000 || Anderson Mesa || LONEOS || — || align=right | 5.9 km || 
|-id=743 bgcolor=#d6d6d6
| 45743 ||  || — || April 29, 2000 || Socorro || LINEAR || EOS || align=right | 6.4 km || 
|-id=744 bgcolor=#E9E9E9
| 45744 ||  || — || April 24, 2000 || Anderson Mesa || LONEOS || GEF || align=right | 3.9 km || 
|-id=745 bgcolor=#E9E9E9
| 45745 ||  || — || April 30, 2000 || Haleakala || NEAT || MIT || align=right | 9.3 km || 
|-id=746 bgcolor=#d6d6d6
| 45746 ||  || — || May 6, 2000 || Socorro || LINEAR || — || align=right | 6.0 km || 
|-id=747 bgcolor=#E9E9E9
| 45747 ||  || — || May 7, 2000 || Socorro || LINEAR || — || align=right | 4.6 km || 
|-id=748 bgcolor=#E9E9E9
| 45748 ||  || — || May 7, 2000 || Socorro || LINEAR || — || align=right | 2.7 km || 
|-id=749 bgcolor=#d6d6d6
| 45749 ||  || — || May 4, 2000 || Anderson Mesa || LONEOS || — || align=right | 4.6 km || 
|-id=750 bgcolor=#d6d6d6
| 45750 ||  || — || May 5, 2000 || Socorro || LINEAR || — || align=right | 8.2 km || 
|-id=751 bgcolor=#d6d6d6
| 45751 ||  || — || May 6, 2000 || Socorro || LINEAR || — || align=right | 5.8 km || 
|-id=752 bgcolor=#d6d6d6
| 45752 Venditti ||  ||  || May 1, 2000 || Anderson Mesa || LONEOS || EOSslow || align=right | 6.6 km || 
|-id=753 bgcolor=#d6d6d6
| 45753 ||  || — || May 1, 2000 || Kitt Peak || Spacewatch || — || align=right | 8.3 km || 
|-id=754 bgcolor=#E9E9E9
| 45754 ||  || — || May 28, 2000 || Socorro || LINEAR || — || align=right | 2.8 km || 
|-id=755 bgcolor=#d6d6d6
| 45755 ||  || — || May 28, 2000 || Socorro || LINEAR || KOR || align=right | 4.5 km || 
|-id=756 bgcolor=#E9E9E9
| 45756 ||  || — || May 28, 2000 || Socorro || LINEAR || — || align=right | 5.9 km || 
|-id=757 bgcolor=#E9E9E9
| 45757 ||  || — || May 28, 2000 || Socorro || LINEAR || — || align=right | 4.1 km || 
|-id=758 bgcolor=#d6d6d6
| 45758 ||  || — || May 28, 2000 || Socorro || LINEAR || HYG || align=right | 8.8 km || 
|-id=759 bgcolor=#E9E9E9
| 45759 ||  || — || May 27, 2000 || Socorro || LINEAR || — || align=right | 6.3 km || 
|-id=760 bgcolor=#fefefe
| 45760 ||  || — || May 30, 2000 || Ondřejov || P. Kušnirák || — || align=right | 3.8 km || 
|-id=761 bgcolor=#E9E9E9
| 45761 ||  || — || May 30, 2000 || Kitt Peak || Spacewatch || — || align=right | 3.1 km || 
|-id=762 bgcolor=#E9E9E9
| 45762 ||  || — || May 27, 2000 || Socorro || LINEAR || — || align=right | 3.1 km || 
|-id=763 bgcolor=#E9E9E9
| 45763 ||  || — || May 27, 2000 || Socorro || LINEAR || — || align=right | 5.2 km || 
|-id=764 bgcolor=#FA8072
| 45764 || 2000 LV || — || June 2, 2000 || Reedy Creek || J. Broughton || — || align=right | 3.2 km || 
|-id=765 bgcolor=#E9E9E9
| 45765 ||  || — || June 4, 2000 || Socorro || LINEAR || GEF || align=right | 4.1 km || 
|-id=766 bgcolor=#d6d6d6
| 45766 ||  || — || June 6, 2000 || Reedy Creek || J. Broughton || — || align=right | 6.3 km || 
|-id=767 bgcolor=#d6d6d6
| 45767 ||  || — || June 8, 2000 || Socorro || LINEAR || — || align=right | 6.5 km || 
|-id=768 bgcolor=#fefefe
| 45768 ||  || — || June 6, 2000 || Anderson Mesa || LONEOS || FLO || align=right | 2.8 km || 
|-id=769 bgcolor=#E9E9E9
| 45769 ||  || — || June 1, 2000 || Haleakala || NEAT || — || align=right | 4.0 km || 
|-id=770 bgcolor=#E9E9E9
| 45770 ||  || — || July 5, 2000 || Prescott || P. G. Comba || — || align=right | 4.0 km || 
|-id=771 bgcolor=#fefefe
| 45771 ||  || — || July 7, 2000 || Socorro || LINEAR || — || align=right | 3.1 km || 
|-id=772 bgcolor=#fefefe
| 45772 ||  || — || July 5, 2000 || Anderson Mesa || LONEOS || — || align=right | 2.4 km || 
|-id=773 bgcolor=#fefefe
| 45773 ||  || — || July 7, 2000 || Anderson Mesa || LONEOS || — || align=right | 4.6 km || 
|-id=774 bgcolor=#E9E9E9
| 45774 ||  || — || July 4, 2000 || Anderson Mesa || LONEOS || — || align=right | 4.8 km || 
|-id=775 bgcolor=#E9E9E9
| 45775 ||  || — || July 4, 2000 || Anderson Mesa || LONEOS || — || align=right | 4.3 km || 
|-id=776 bgcolor=#d6d6d6
| 45776 ||  || — || July 2, 2000 || Kitt Peak || Spacewatch || — || align=right | 5.7 km || 
|-id=777 bgcolor=#E9E9E9
| 45777 ||  || — || July 24, 2000 || Socorro || LINEAR || EUN || align=right | 3.8 km || 
|-id=778 bgcolor=#E9E9E9
| 45778 ||  || — || July 24, 2000 || Socorro || LINEAR || — || align=right | 4.4 km || 
|-id=779 bgcolor=#fefefe
| 45779 ||  || — || July 29, 2000 || Socorro || LINEAR || — || align=right | 2.9 km || 
|-id=780 bgcolor=#E9E9E9
| 45780 ||  || — || July 23, 2000 || Socorro || LINEAR || — || align=right | 3.7 km || 
|-id=781 bgcolor=#E9E9E9
| 45781 ||  || — || July 23, 2000 || Socorro || LINEAR || — || align=right | 3.7 km || 
|-id=782 bgcolor=#fefefe
| 45782 ||  || — || July 23, 2000 || Socorro || LINEAR || — || align=right | 2.7 km || 
|-id=783 bgcolor=#fefefe
| 45783 ||  || — || July 23, 2000 || Socorro || LINEAR || NYS || align=right | 3.1 km || 
|-id=784 bgcolor=#E9E9E9
| 45784 ||  || — || July 23, 2000 || Socorro || LINEAR || — || align=right | 3.3 km || 
|-id=785 bgcolor=#fefefe
| 45785 ||  || — || July 30, 2000 || Socorro || LINEAR || — || align=right | 2.4 km || 
|-id=786 bgcolor=#E9E9E9
| 45786 ||  || — || July 30, 2000 || Socorro || LINEAR || GEF || align=right | 3.2 km || 
|-id=787 bgcolor=#fefefe
| 45787 ||  || — || July 23, 2000 || Socorro || LINEAR || V || align=right | 3.1 km || 
|-id=788 bgcolor=#fefefe
| 45788 ||  || — || July 23, 2000 || Socorro || LINEAR || — || align=right | 2.9 km || 
|-id=789 bgcolor=#fefefe
| 45789 ||  || — || July 23, 2000 || Socorro || LINEAR || NYS || align=right | 2.8 km || 
|-id=790 bgcolor=#fefefe
| 45790 ||  || — || July 30, 2000 || Socorro || LINEAR || V || align=right | 1.9 km || 
|-id=791 bgcolor=#fefefe
| 45791 ||  || — || July 30, 2000 || Socorro || LINEAR || KLI || align=right | 6.4 km || 
|-id=792 bgcolor=#fefefe
| 45792 ||  || — || July 30, 2000 || Socorro || LINEAR || V || align=right | 2.4 km || 
|-id=793 bgcolor=#fefefe
| 45793 ||  || — || July 31, 2000 || Socorro || LINEAR || — || align=right | 2.5 km || 
|-id=794 bgcolor=#fefefe
| 45794 ||  || — || July 31, 2000 || Socorro || LINEAR || MAS || align=right | 2.7 km || 
|-id=795 bgcolor=#fefefe
| 45795 ||  || — || July 31, 2000 || Socorro || LINEAR || V || align=right | 2.1 km || 
|-id=796 bgcolor=#d6d6d6
| 45796 ||  || — || July 29, 2000 || Anderson Mesa || LONEOS || — || align=right | 6.6 km || 
|-id=797 bgcolor=#fefefe
| 45797 ||  || — || August 1, 2000 || Socorro || LINEAR || — || align=right | 2.1 km || 
|-id=798 bgcolor=#E9E9E9
| 45798 ||  || — || August 1, 2000 || Socorro || LINEAR || — || align=right | 3.4 km || 
|-id=799 bgcolor=#fefefe
| 45799 ||  || — || August 1, 2000 || Socorro || LINEAR || — || align=right | 2.2 km || 
|-id=800 bgcolor=#d6d6d6
| 45800 ||  || — || August 1, 2000 || Socorro || LINEAR || THB || align=right | 8.8 km || 
|}

45801–45900 

|-bgcolor=#fefefe
| 45801 ||  || — || August 4, 2000 || Haleakala || NEAT || V || align=right | 2.6 km || 
|-id=802 bgcolor=#C2E0FF
| 45802 ||  || — || August 5, 2000 || Mauna Kea || M. J. Holman || cubewano (cold)critical || align=right | 111 km || 
|-id=803 bgcolor=#E9E9E9
| 45803 ||  || — || August 23, 2000 || Reedy Creek || J. Broughton || — || align=right | 3.1 km || 
|-id=804 bgcolor=#fefefe
| 45804 ||  || — || August 24, 2000 || Socorro || LINEAR || V || align=right | 1.6 km || 
|-id=805 bgcolor=#fefefe
| 45805 ||  || — || August 24, 2000 || Socorro || LINEAR || — || align=right | 2.1 km || 
|-id=806 bgcolor=#fefefe
| 45806 ||  || — || August 24, 2000 || Socorro || LINEAR || — || align=right | 2.2 km || 
|-id=807 bgcolor=#fefefe
| 45807 ||  || — || August 24, 2000 || Socorro || LINEAR || — || align=right | 2.2 km || 
|-id=808 bgcolor=#fefefe
| 45808 ||  || — || August 25, 2000 || Socorro || LINEAR || — || align=right | 1.6 km || 
|-id=809 bgcolor=#fefefe
| 45809 ||  || — || August 24, 2000 || Socorro || LINEAR || — || align=right | 1.9 km || 
|-id=810 bgcolor=#fefefe
| 45810 ||  || — || August 26, 2000 || Socorro || LINEAR || fast? || align=right | 2.3 km || 
|-id=811 bgcolor=#E9E9E9
| 45811 ||  || — || August 24, 2000 || Socorro || LINEAR || — || align=right | 2.4 km || 
|-id=812 bgcolor=#fefefe
| 45812 ||  || — || August 24, 2000 || Socorro || LINEAR || — || align=right | 2.3 km || 
|-id=813 bgcolor=#fefefe
| 45813 ||  || — || August 24, 2000 || Socorro || LINEAR || — || align=right | 2.1 km || 
|-id=814 bgcolor=#fefefe
| 45814 ||  || — || August 28, 2000 || Socorro || LINEAR || — || align=right | 2.0 km || 
|-id=815 bgcolor=#fefefe
| 45815 ||  || — || August 28, 2000 || Socorro || LINEAR || V || align=right | 2.1 km || 
|-id=816 bgcolor=#E9E9E9
| 45816 ||  || — || August 24, 2000 || Socorro || LINEAR || — || align=right | 2.8 km || 
|-id=817 bgcolor=#fefefe
| 45817 ||  || — || August 24, 2000 || Socorro || LINEAR || V || align=right | 2.2 km || 
|-id=818 bgcolor=#fefefe
| 45818 ||  || — || August 24, 2000 || Socorro || LINEAR || FLO || align=right | 2.1 km || 
|-id=819 bgcolor=#fefefe
| 45819 ||  || — || August 28, 2000 || Socorro || LINEAR || — || align=right | 2.3 km || 
|-id=820 bgcolor=#E9E9E9
| 45820 ||  || — || August 28, 2000 || Socorro || LINEAR || — || align=right | 2.5 km || 
|-id=821 bgcolor=#fefefe
| 45821 ||  || — || August 24, 2000 || Socorro || LINEAR || — || align=right | 1.8 km || 
|-id=822 bgcolor=#C2FFFF
| 45822 ||  || — || August 28, 2000 || Socorro || LINEAR || L5 || align=right | 19 km || 
|-id=823 bgcolor=#fefefe
| 45823 ||  || — || August 25, 2000 || Socorro || LINEAR || V || align=right | 1.9 km || 
|-id=824 bgcolor=#fefefe
| 45824 ||  || — || August 25, 2000 || Socorro || LINEAR || FLO || align=right | 1.8 km || 
|-id=825 bgcolor=#fefefe
| 45825 ||  || — || August 25, 2000 || Socorro || LINEAR || H || align=right | 1.7 km || 
|-id=826 bgcolor=#fefefe
| 45826 ||  || — || August 25, 2000 || Socorro || LINEAR || — || align=right | 2.3 km || 
|-id=827 bgcolor=#fefefe
| 45827 ||  || — || August 25, 2000 || Socorro || LINEAR || — || align=right | 2.3 km || 
|-id=828 bgcolor=#fefefe
| 45828 ||  || — || August 31, 2000 || Socorro || LINEAR || V || align=right | 2.3 km || 
|-id=829 bgcolor=#d6d6d6
| 45829 ||  || — || August 31, 2000 || Socorro || LINEAR || — || align=right | 3.6 km || 
|-id=830 bgcolor=#fefefe
| 45830 ||  || — || August 31, 2000 || Socorro || LINEAR || — || align=right | 3.2 km || 
|-id=831 bgcolor=#E9E9E9
| 45831 ||  || — || August 26, 2000 || Socorro || LINEAR || — || align=right | 3.8 km || 
|-id=832 bgcolor=#fefefe
| 45832 ||  || — || August 26, 2000 || Socorro || LINEAR || FLO || align=right | 2.7 km || 
|-id=833 bgcolor=#fefefe
| 45833 ||  || — || August 26, 2000 || Socorro || LINEAR || — || align=right | 2.0 km || 
|-id=834 bgcolor=#fefefe
| 45834 ||  || — || August 31, 2000 || Socorro || LINEAR || — || align=right | 1.7 km || 
|-id=835 bgcolor=#fefefe
| 45835 || 2000 RZ || — || September 1, 2000 || Socorro || LINEAR || — || align=right | 2.2 km || 
|-id=836 bgcolor=#fefefe
| 45836 ||  || — || September 1, 2000 || Socorro || LINEAR || — || align=right | 1.8 km || 
|-id=837 bgcolor=#fefefe
| 45837 ||  || — || September 1, 2000 || Socorro || LINEAR || LCI || align=right | 3.6 km || 
|-id=838 bgcolor=#fefefe
| 45838 ||  || — || September 1, 2000 || Socorro || LINEAR || V || align=right | 2.5 km || 
|-id=839 bgcolor=#fefefe
| 45839 ||  || — || September 3, 2000 || Socorro || LINEAR || H || align=right | 1.6 km || 
|-id=840 bgcolor=#E9E9E9
| 45840 ||  || — || September 3, 2000 || Socorro || LINEAR || — || align=right | 5.4 km || 
|-id=841 bgcolor=#fefefe
| 45841 ||  || — || September 5, 2000 || Socorro || LINEAR || NYS || align=right | 4.7 km || 
|-id=842 bgcolor=#fefefe
| 45842 ||  || — || September 1, 2000 || Socorro || LINEAR || — || align=right | 2.2 km || 
|-id=843 bgcolor=#fefefe
| 45843 ||  || — || September 2, 2000 || Socorro || LINEAR || — || align=right | 1.8 km || 
|-id=844 bgcolor=#E9E9E9
| 45844 ||  || — || September 3, 2000 || Socorro || LINEAR || — || align=right | 4.6 km || 
|-id=845 bgcolor=#fefefe
| 45845 ||  || — || September 3, 2000 || Socorro || LINEAR || V || align=right | 1.9 km || 
|-id=846 bgcolor=#fefefe
| 45846 Avdellidou ||  ||  || September 4, 2000 || Anderson Mesa || LONEOS || NYS || align=right | 5.2 km || 
|-id=847 bgcolor=#fefefe
| 45847 Gartrelle ||  ||  || September 4, 2000 || Anderson Mesa || LONEOS || NYS || align=right | 4.5 km || 
|-id=848 bgcolor=#fefefe
| 45848 ||  || — || September 20, 2000 || Socorro || LINEAR || FLO || align=right | 2.2 km || 
|-id=849 bgcolor=#fefefe
| 45849 ||  || — || September 23, 2000 || Socorro || LINEAR || — || align=right | 3.1 km || 
|-id=850 bgcolor=#d6d6d6
| 45850 ||  || — || September 25, 2000 || Socorro || LINEAR || HIL3:2 || align=right | 15 km || 
|-id=851 bgcolor=#fefefe
| 45851 ||  || — || September 27, 2000 || Socorro || LINEAR || NYS || align=right | 2.0 km || 
|-id=852 bgcolor=#E9E9E9
| 45852 ||  || — || September 24, 2000 || Socorro || LINEAR || — || align=right | 2.8 km || 
|-id=853 bgcolor=#fefefe
| 45853 ||  || — || September 26, 2000 || Socorro || LINEAR || — || align=right | 1.8 km || 
|-id=854 bgcolor=#fefefe
| 45854 ||  || — || September 23, 2000 || Socorro || LINEAR || V || align=right | 1.4 km || 
|-id=855 bgcolor=#fefefe
| 45855 Susumuyoshitomi ||  ||  || October 3, 2000 || Bisei SG Center || BATTeRS || NYS || align=right | 3.1 km || 
|-id=856 bgcolor=#d6d6d6
| 45856 ||  || — || October 1, 2000 || Socorro || LINEAR || — || align=right | 9.3 km || 
|-id=857 bgcolor=#E9E9E9
| 45857 ||  || — || October 2, 2000 || Anderson Mesa || LONEOS || EUN || align=right | 6.2 km || 
|-id=858 bgcolor=#fefefe
| 45858 ||  || — || October 24, 2000 || Socorro || LINEAR || NYS || align=right | 6.8 km || 
|-id=859 bgcolor=#fefefe
| 45859 ||  || — || October 25, 2000 || Socorro || LINEAR || — || align=right | 2.5 km || 
|-id=860 bgcolor=#fefefe
| 45860 ||  || — || October 24, 2000 || Socorro || LINEAR || FLO || align=right | 2.3 km || 
|-id=861 bgcolor=#d6d6d6
| 45861 ||  || — || October 24, 2000 || Socorro || LINEAR || — || align=right | 7.9 km || 
|-id=862 bgcolor=#d6d6d6
| 45862 ||  || — || October 24, 2000 || Socorro || LINEAR || 3:2 || align=right | 8.6 km || 
|-id=863 bgcolor=#fefefe
| 45863 ||  || — || October 24, 2000 || Socorro || LINEAR || FLO || align=right | 2.4 km || 
|-id=864 bgcolor=#fefefe
| 45864 ||  || — || October 25, 2000 || Socorro || LINEAR || — || align=right | 4.3 km || 
|-id=865 bgcolor=#fefefe
| 45865 ||  || — || October 25, 2000 || Socorro || LINEAR || V || align=right | 3.0 km || 
|-id=866 bgcolor=#d6d6d6
| 45866 ||  || — || October 31, 2000 || Socorro || LINEAR || TEL || align=right | 4.4 km || 
|-id=867 bgcolor=#fefefe
| 45867 ||  || — || November 1, 2000 || Socorro || LINEAR || — || align=right | 2.2 km || 
|-id=868 bgcolor=#d6d6d6
| 45868 ||  || — || November 1, 2000 || Socorro || LINEAR || THM || align=right | 5.7 km || 
|-id=869 bgcolor=#fefefe
| 45869 ||  || — || November 1, 2000 || Socorro || LINEAR || FLO || align=right | 2.2 km || 
|-id=870 bgcolor=#fefefe
| 45870 ||  || — || November 1, 2000 || Socorro || LINEAR || FLO || align=right | 2.4 km || 
|-id=871 bgcolor=#E9E9E9
| 45871 ||  || — || November 1, 2000 || Socorro || LINEAR || — || align=right | 3.8 km || 
|-id=872 bgcolor=#fefefe
| 45872 ||  || — || November 2, 2000 || Socorro || LINEAR || — || align=right | 1.9 km || 
|-id=873 bgcolor=#fefefe
| 45873 ||  || — || November 9, 2000 || Socorro || LINEAR || — || align=right | 2.1 km || 
|-id=874 bgcolor=#fefefe
| 45874 ||  || — || November 17, 2000 || Socorro || LINEAR || H || align=right | 1.5 km || 
|-id=875 bgcolor=#d6d6d6
| 45875 ||  || — || November 25, 2000 || Fountain Hills || C. W. Juels || — || align=right | 14 km || 
|-id=876 bgcolor=#fefefe
| 45876 ||  || — || November 26, 2000 || Desert Beaver || W. K. Y. Yeung || FLO || align=right | 2.7 km || 
|-id=877 bgcolor=#E9E9E9
| 45877 ||  || — || November 21, 2000 || Socorro || LINEAR || BAR || align=right | 4.3 km || 
|-id=878 bgcolor=#fefefe
| 45878 Sadaoaoki ||  ||  || November 23, 2000 || Bisei SG Center || BATTeRS || H || align=right | 2.0 km || 
|-id=879 bgcolor=#fefefe
| 45879 ||  || — || November 20, 2000 || Socorro || LINEAR || FLO || align=right | 1.4 km || 
|-id=880 bgcolor=#fefefe
| 45880 ||  || — || November 21, 2000 || Socorro || LINEAR || H || align=right | 1.5 km || 
|-id=881 bgcolor=#E9E9E9
| 45881 ||  || — || November 20, 2000 || Socorro || LINEAR || — || align=right | 3.6 km || 
|-id=882 bgcolor=#fefefe
| 45882 ||  || — || November 21, 2000 || Socorro || LINEAR || ERI || align=right | 4.8 km || 
|-id=883 bgcolor=#fefefe
| 45883 ||  || — || November 20, 2000 || Socorro || LINEAR || FLO || align=right | 2.5 km || 
|-id=884 bgcolor=#fefefe
| 45884 ||  || — || November 21, 2000 || Socorro || LINEAR || — || align=right | 2.3 km || 
|-id=885 bgcolor=#fefefe
| 45885 ||  || — || November 21, 2000 || Socorro || LINEAR || — || align=right | 3.9 km || 
|-id=886 bgcolor=#fefefe
| 45886 ||  || — || November 20, 2000 || Socorro || LINEAR || — || align=right | 3.0 km || 
|-id=887 bgcolor=#fefefe
| 45887 ||  || — || November 20, 2000 || Socorro || LINEAR || FLO || align=right | 2.2 km || 
|-id=888 bgcolor=#fefefe
| 45888 ||  || — || November 20, 2000 || Kitt Peak || Spacewatch || — || align=right | 2.5 km || 
|-id=889 bgcolor=#d6d6d6
| 45889 ||  || — || November 20, 2000 || Anderson Mesa || LONEOS || KOR || align=right | 3.9 km || 
|-id=890 bgcolor=#fefefe
| 45890 ||  || — || November 26, 2000 || Desert Beaver || W. K. Y. Yeung || — || align=right | 2.2 km || 
|-id=891 bgcolor=#fefefe
| 45891 ||  || — || November 28, 2000 || Kitt Peak || Spacewatch || V || align=right | 1.9 km || 
|-id=892 bgcolor=#fefefe
| 45892 ||  || — || November 26, 2000 || Socorro || LINEAR || CIM || align=right | 8.0 km || 
|-id=893 bgcolor=#fefefe
| 45893 ||  || — || December 1, 2000 || Socorro || LINEAR || — || align=right | 3.4 km || 
|-id=894 bgcolor=#E9E9E9
| 45894 ||  || — || December 1, 2000 || Socorro || LINEAR || — || align=right | 3.5 km || 
|-id=895 bgcolor=#fefefe
| 45895 ||  || — || December 4, 2000 || Socorro || LINEAR || — || align=right | 2.2 km || 
|-id=896 bgcolor=#fefefe
| 45896 ||  || — || December 4, 2000 || Socorro || LINEAR || — || align=right | 3.1 km || 
|-id=897 bgcolor=#fefefe
| 45897 ||  || — || December 4, 2000 || Socorro || LINEAR || V || align=right | 1.9 km || 
|-id=898 bgcolor=#fefefe
| 45898 ||  || — || December 4, 2000 || Socorro || LINEAR || H || align=right | 2.6 km || 
|-id=899 bgcolor=#fefefe
| 45899 ||  || — || December 4, 2000 || Socorro || LINEAR || — || align=right | 2.9 km || 
|-id=900 bgcolor=#fefefe
| 45900 ||  || — || December 20, 2000 || Socorro || LINEAR || H || align=right | 2.3 km || 
|}

45901–46000 

|-bgcolor=#E9E9E9
| 45901 ||  || — || December 23, 2000 || Desert Beaver || W. K. Y. Yeung || GER || align=right | 7.2 km || 
|-id=902 bgcolor=#E9E9E9
| 45902 ||  || — || December 20, 2000 || Socorro || LINEAR || — || align=right | 2.7 km || 
|-id=903 bgcolor=#fefefe
| 45903 ||  || — || December 20, 2000 || Socorro || LINEAR || — || align=right | 5.2 km || 
|-id=904 bgcolor=#E9E9E9
| 45904 ||  || — || December 27, 2000 || Oizumi || T. Kobayashi || EUN || align=right | 4.2 km || 
|-id=905 bgcolor=#fefefe
| 45905 ||  || — || December 28, 2000 || Socorro || LINEAR || — || align=right | 2.1 km || 
|-id=906 bgcolor=#d6d6d6
| 45906 ||  || — || December 28, 2000 || Socorro || LINEAR || — || align=right | 11 km || 
|-id=907 bgcolor=#fefefe
| 45907 ||  || — || December 28, 2000 || Socorro || LINEAR || FLO || align=right | 2.1 km || 
|-id=908 bgcolor=#fefefe
| 45908 ||  || — || December 30, 2000 || Socorro || LINEAR || — || align=right | 2.6 km || 
|-id=909 bgcolor=#fefefe
| 45909 ||  || — || December 30, 2000 || Socorro || LINEAR || — || align=right | 2.1 km || 
|-id=910 bgcolor=#E9E9E9
| 45910 ||  || — || December 30, 2000 || Socorro || LINEAR || — || align=right | 5.1 km || 
|-id=911 bgcolor=#fefefe
| 45911 ||  || — || December 30, 2000 || Socorro || LINEAR || — || align=right | 2.3 km || 
|-id=912 bgcolor=#fefefe
| 45912 ||  || — || December 30, 2000 || Kitt Peak || Spacewatch || — || align=right | 1.7 km || 
|-id=913 bgcolor=#fefefe
| 45913 ||  || — || December 28, 2000 || Socorro || LINEAR || — || align=right | 2.4 km || 
|-id=914 bgcolor=#E9E9E9
| 45914 ||  || — || December 28, 2000 || Socorro || LINEAR || — || align=right | 2.9 km || 
|-id=915 bgcolor=#fefefe
| 45915 ||  || — || December 28, 2000 || Socorro || LINEAR || — || align=right | 2.6 km || 
|-id=916 bgcolor=#fefefe
| 45916 ||  || — || December 28, 2000 || Socorro || LINEAR || — || align=right | 2.0 km || 
|-id=917 bgcolor=#fefefe
| 45917 ||  || — || December 30, 2000 || Socorro || LINEAR || FLO || align=right | 1.5 km || 
|-id=918 bgcolor=#fefefe
| 45918 ||  || — || December 30, 2000 || Socorro || LINEAR || NYS || align=right | 1.7 km || 
|-id=919 bgcolor=#fefefe
| 45919 ||  || — || December 28, 2000 || Socorro || LINEAR || — || align=right | 3.1 km || 
|-id=920 bgcolor=#E9E9E9
| 45920 ||  || — || December 28, 2000 || Socorro || LINEAR || ADE || align=right | 11 km || 
|-id=921 bgcolor=#E9E9E9
| 45921 ||  || — || December 28, 2000 || Socorro || LINEAR || GEF || align=right | 5.0 km || 
|-id=922 bgcolor=#fefefe
| 45922 ||  || — || December 28, 2000 || Socorro || LINEAR || FLO || align=right | 1.9 km || 
|-id=923 bgcolor=#d6d6d6
| 45923 ||  || — || December 30, 2000 || Socorro || LINEAR || — || align=right | 3.6 km || 
|-id=924 bgcolor=#fefefe
| 45924 ||  || — || December 30, 2000 || Socorro || LINEAR || — || align=right | 2.7 km || 
|-id=925 bgcolor=#fefefe
| 45925 ||  || — || December 30, 2000 || Socorro || LINEAR || NYS || align=right | 1.7 km || 
|-id=926 bgcolor=#fefefe
| 45926 ||  || — || December 30, 2000 || Socorro || LINEAR || V || align=right | 1.7 km || 
|-id=927 bgcolor=#fefefe
| 45927 ||  || — || December 30, 2000 || Socorro || LINEAR || — || align=right | 2.7 km || 
|-id=928 bgcolor=#fefefe
| 45928 ||  || — || December 30, 2000 || Socorro || LINEAR || — || align=right | 3.7 km || 
|-id=929 bgcolor=#E9E9E9
| 45929 ||  || — || December 30, 2000 || Socorro || LINEAR || — || align=right | 2.8 km || 
|-id=930 bgcolor=#fefefe
| 45930 ||  || — || December 30, 2000 || Socorro || LINEAR || FLO || align=right | 1.8 km || 
|-id=931 bgcolor=#fefefe
| 45931 ||  || — || December 21, 2000 || Socorro || LINEAR || — || align=right | 2.6 km || 
|-id=932 bgcolor=#E9E9E9
| 45932 ||  || — || December 22, 2000 || Haleakala || NEAT || EUN || align=right | 10 km || 
|-id=933 bgcolor=#E9E9E9
| 45933 ||  || — || December 29, 2000 || Haleakala || NEAT || — || align=right | 2.0 km || 
|-id=934 bgcolor=#E9E9E9
| 45934 ||  || — || December 29, 2000 || Kitt Peak || Spacewatch || — || align=right | 2.0 km || 
|-id=935 bgcolor=#E9E9E9
| 45935 ||  || — || December 30, 2000 || Anderson Mesa || LONEOS || EUN || align=right | 4.3 km || 
|-id=936 bgcolor=#d6d6d6
| 45936 ||  || — || December 30, 2000 || Anderson Mesa || LONEOS || EOS || align=right | 7.9 km || 
|-id=937 bgcolor=#d6d6d6
| 45937 ||  || — || December 30, 2000 || Anderson Mesa || LONEOS || — || align=right | 9.9 km || 
|-id=938 bgcolor=#fefefe
| 45938 ||  || — || January 2, 2001 || Socorro || LINEAR || V || align=right | 2.1 km || 
|-id=939 bgcolor=#fefefe
| 45939 ||  || — || January 2, 2001 || Socorro || LINEAR || V || align=right | 1.6 km || 
|-id=940 bgcolor=#fefefe
| 45940 ||  || — || January 2, 2001 || Socorro || LINEAR || — || align=right | 2.4 km || 
|-id=941 bgcolor=#E9E9E9
| 45941 ||  || — || January 2, 2001 || Socorro || LINEAR || — || align=right | 2.6 km || 
|-id=942 bgcolor=#fefefe
| 45942 ||  || — || January 2, 2001 || Socorro || LINEAR || — || align=right | 2.3 km || 
|-id=943 bgcolor=#fefefe
| 45943 ||  || — || January 2, 2001 || Socorro || LINEAR || — || align=right | 2.3 km || 
|-id=944 bgcolor=#fefefe
| 45944 ||  || — || January 2, 2001 || Socorro || LINEAR || — || align=right | 6.5 km || 
|-id=945 bgcolor=#fefefe
| 45945 ||  || — || January 2, 2001 || Socorro || LINEAR || NYS || align=right | 2.2 km || 
|-id=946 bgcolor=#E9E9E9
| 45946 ||  || — || January 2, 2001 || Socorro || LINEAR || RAF || align=right | 2.7 km || 
|-id=947 bgcolor=#fefefe
| 45947 ||  || — || January 2, 2001 || Socorro || LINEAR || — || align=right | 2.2 km || 
|-id=948 bgcolor=#E9E9E9
| 45948 ||  || — || January 2, 2001 || Socorro || LINEAR || — || align=right | 2.9 km || 
|-id=949 bgcolor=#E9E9E9
| 45949 ||  || — || January 3, 2001 || Socorro || LINEAR || MAR || align=right | 3.5 km || 
|-id=950 bgcolor=#fefefe
| 45950 ||  || — || January 4, 2001 || Socorro || LINEAR || H || align=right | 1.5 km || 
|-id=951 bgcolor=#fefefe
| 45951 ||  || — || January 4, 2001 || Socorro || LINEAR || — || align=right | 2.7 km || 
|-id=952 bgcolor=#fefefe
| 45952 ||  || — || January 4, 2001 || Socorro || LINEAR || V || align=right | 2.6 km || 
|-id=953 bgcolor=#fefefe
| 45953 ||  || — || January 4, 2001 || Socorro || LINEAR || — || align=right | 2.8 km || 
|-id=954 bgcolor=#fefefe
| 45954 ||  || — || January 3, 2001 || Anderson Mesa || LONEOS || — || align=right | 2.6 km || 
|-id=955 bgcolor=#E9E9E9
| 45955 ||  || — || January 3, 2001 || Anderson Mesa || LONEOS || — || align=right | 2.3 km || 
|-id=956 bgcolor=#fefefe
| 45956 ||  || — || January 3, 2001 || Socorro || LINEAR || — || align=right | 3.2 km || 
|-id=957 bgcolor=#fefefe
| 45957 ||  || — || January 15, 2001 || Oizumi || T. Kobayashi || NYS || align=right | 2.0 km || 
|-id=958 bgcolor=#fefefe
| 45958 ||  || — || January 15, 2001 || Oizumi || T. Kobayashi || PHO || align=right | 2.7 km || 
|-id=959 bgcolor=#fefefe
| 45959 ||  || — || January 15, 2001 || Kitt Peak || Spacewatch || FLO || align=right | 1.5 km || 
|-id=960 bgcolor=#fefefe
| 45960 || 2001 BX || — || January 17, 2001 || Oizumi || T. Kobayashi || H || align=right | 1.7 km || 
|-id=961 bgcolor=#fefefe
| 45961 ||  || — || January 18, 2001 || Socorro || LINEAR || — || align=right | 2.2 km || 
|-id=962 bgcolor=#fefefe
| 45962 ||  || — || January 20, 2001 || Haleakala || NEAT || H || align=right | 1.5 km || 
|-id=963 bgcolor=#E9E9E9
| 45963 ||  || — || January 21, 2001 || Oizumi || T. Kobayashi || — || align=right | 2.3 km || 
|-id=964 bgcolor=#fefefe
| 45964 ||  || — || January 21, 2001 || Oizumi || T. Kobayashi || — || align=right | 2.2 km || 
|-id=965 bgcolor=#fefefe
| 45965 ||  || — || January 19, 2001 || Socorro || LINEAR || V || align=right | 1.9 km || 
|-id=966 bgcolor=#fefefe
| 45966 ||  || — || January 20, 2001 || Socorro || LINEAR || — || align=right | 2.1 km || 
|-id=967 bgcolor=#fefefe
| 45967 ||  || — || January 20, 2001 || Socorro || LINEAR || FLO || align=right | 1.4 km || 
|-id=968 bgcolor=#E9E9E9
| 45968 ||  || — || January 20, 2001 || Socorro || LINEAR || — || align=right | 5.9 km || 
|-id=969 bgcolor=#fefefe
| 45969 ||  || — || January 20, 2001 || Socorro || LINEAR || — || align=right | 1.9 km || 
|-id=970 bgcolor=#fefefe
| 45970 ||  || — || January 20, 2001 || Socorro || LINEAR || — || align=right | 1.4 km || 
|-id=971 bgcolor=#fefefe
| 45971 ||  || — || January 20, 2001 || Socorro || LINEAR || FLO || align=right | 1.5 km || 
|-id=972 bgcolor=#fefefe
| 45972 ||  || — || January 20, 2001 || Socorro || LINEAR || FLO || align=right | 1.9 km || 
|-id=973 bgcolor=#fefefe
| 45973 ||  || — || January 20, 2001 || Socorro || LINEAR || — || align=right | 2.5 km || 
|-id=974 bgcolor=#fefefe
| 45974 ||  || — || January 20, 2001 || Socorro || LINEAR || — || align=right | 2.1 km || 
|-id=975 bgcolor=#E9E9E9
| 45975 ||  || — || January 21, 2001 || Socorro || LINEAR || HNS || align=right | 4.1 km || 
|-id=976 bgcolor=#d6d6d6
| 45976 ||  || — || January 25, 2001 || Kitt Peak || Spacewatch || — || align=right | 5.0 km || 
|-id=977 bgcolor=#fefefe
| 45977 ||  || — || January 19, 2001 || Socorro || LINEAR || — || align=right | 5.8 km || 
|-id=978 bgcolor=#E9E9E9
| 45978 ||  || — || January 19, 2001 || Socorro || LINEAR || — || align=right | 4.1 km || 
|-id=979 bgcolor=#fefefe
| 45979 ||  || — || January 21, 2001 || Socorro || LINEAR || — || align=right | 2.6 km || 
|-id=980 bgcolor=#E9E9E9
| 45980 ||  || — || January 21, 2001 || Socorro || LINEAR || EUN || align=right | 3.0 km || 
|-id=981 bgcolor=#E9E9E9
| 45981 ||  || — || January 28, 2001 || Oizumi || T. Kobayashi || EUN || align=right | 3.1 km || 
|-id=982 bgcolor=#E9E9E9
| 45982 ||  || — || January 27, 2001 || Haleakala || NEAT || EUN || align=right | 2.6 km || 
|-id=983 bgcolor=#fefefe
| 45983 ||  || — || January 18, 2001 || Kitt Peak || Spacewatch || — || align=right | 3.6 km || 
|-id=984 bgcolor=#E9E9E9
| 45984 ||  || — || January 19, 2001 || Socorro || LINEAR || — || align=right | 2.9 km || 
|-id=985 bgcolor=#fefefe
| 45985 ||  || — || January 26, 2001 || Socorro || LINEAR || FLO || align=right | 4.2 km || 
|-id=986 bgcolor=#fefefe
| 45986 ||  || — || January 26, 2001 || Socorro || LINEAR || V || align=right | 2.0 km || 
|-id=987 bgcolor=#d6d6d6
| 45987 ||  || — || January 26, 2001 || Socorro || LINEAR || — || align=right | 6.5 km || 
|-id=988 bgcolor=#E9E9E9
| 45988 ||  || — || January 26, 2001 || Socorro || LINEAR || — || align=right | 3.4 km || 
|-id=989 bgcolor=#d6d6d6
| 45989 ||  || — || January 30, 2001 || Socorro || LINEAR || — || align=right | 8.9 km || 
|-id=990 bgcolor=#fefefe
| 45990 ||  || — || January 31, 2001 || Socorro || LINEAR || V || align=right | 2.5 km || 
|-id=991 bgcolor=#fefefe
| 45991 ||  || — || January 26, 2001 || Socorro || LINEAR || — || align=right | 6.1 km || 
|-id=992 bgcolor=#fefefe
| 45992 ||  || — || January 29, 2001 || Socorro || LINEAR || — || align=right | 1.6 km || 
|-id=993 bgcolor=#fefefe
| 45993 ||  || — || January 29, 2001 || Socorro || LINEAR || V || align=right | 1.4 km || 
|-id=994 bgcolor=#fefefe
| 45994 ||  || — || January 29, 2001 || Socorro || LINEAR || FLO || align=right | 1.5 km || 
|-id=995 bgcolor=#E9E9E9
| 45995 ||  || — || January 31, 2001 || Socorro || LINEAR || — || align=right | 4.4 km || 
|-id=996 bgcolor=#E9E9E9
| 45996 ||  || — || January 27, 2001 || Haleakala || NEAT || — || align=right | 3.1 km || 
|-id=997 bgcolor=#fefefe
| 45997 ||  || — || January 29, 2001 || Socorro || LINEAR || — || align=right | 1.8 km || 
|-id=998 bgcolor=#E9E9E9
| 45998 ||  || — || January 26, 2001 || Socorro || LINEAR || — || align=right | 3.0 km || 
|-id=999 bgcolor=#fefefe
| 45999 ||  || — || January 26, 2001 || Socorro || LINEAR || FLO || align=right | 1.6 km || 
|-id=000 bgcolor=#fefefe
| 46000 ||  || — || January 21, 2001 || Socorro || LINEAR || V || align=right | 1.7 km || 
|}

References

External links 
 Discovery Circumstances: Numbered Minor Planets (45001)–(50000) (IAU Minor Planet Center)

0045